

274001–274100 

|-bgcolor=#d6d6d6
| 274001 ||  || — || August 4, 2007 || Great Shefford || P. Birtwhistle || — || align=right | 3.7 km || 
|-id=002 bgcolor=#d6d6d6
| 274002 ||  || — || August 8, 2007 || Socorro || LINEAR || — || align=right | 4.4 km || 
|-id=003 bgcolor=#d6d6d6
| 274003 ||  || — || August 9, 2007 || Dauban || Chante-Perdrix Obs. || EOS || align=right | 2.8 km || 
|-id=004 bgcolor=#E9E9E9
| 274004 ||  || — || August 9, 2007 || Socorro || LINEAR || — || align=right | 2.9 km || 
|-id=005 bgcolor=#d6d6d6
| 274005 ||  || — || August 12, 2007 || Socorro || LINEAR || — || align=right | 4.4 km || 
|-id=006 bgcolor=#d6d6d6
| 274006 ||  || — || August 14, 2007 || Socorro || LINEAR || — || align=right | 5.6 km || 
|-id=007 bgcolor=#d6d6d6
| 274007 ||  || — || August 15, 2007 || Altschwendt || W. Ries || — || align=right | 3.4 km || 
|-id=008 bgcolor=#d6d6d6
| 274008 ||  || — || August 13, 2007 || Socorro || LINEAR || — || align=right | 4.0 km || 
|-id=009 bgcolor=#d6d6d6
| 274009 ||  || — || August 10, 2007 || Kitt Peak || Spacewatch || THM || align=right | 2.1 km || 
|-id=010 bgcolor=#d6d6d6
| 274010 ||  || — || August 10, 2007 || Kitt Peak || Spacewatch || EOS || align=right | 2.2 km || 
|-id=011 bgcolor=#d6d6d6
| 274011 ||  || — || August 10, 2007 || Kitt Peak || Spacewatch || — || align=right | 3.2 km || 
|-id=012 bgcolor=#d6d6d6
| 274012 ||  || — || August 21, 2007 || Anderson Mesa || LONEOS || VER || align=right | 5.7 km || 
|-id=013 bgcolor=#d6d6d6
| 274013 ||  || — || August 22, 2007 || Socorro || LINEAR || HIL3:2 || align=right | 7.6 km || 
|-id=014 bgcolor=#d6d6d6
| 274014 ||  || — || August 23, 2007 || Kitt Peak || Spacewatch || — || align=right | 3.2 km || 
|-id=015 bgcolor=#d6d6d6
| 274015 ||  || — || August 21, 2007 || Anderson Mesa || LONEOS || HYG || align=right | 3.1 km || 
|-id=016 bgcolor=#d6d6d6
| 274016 ||  || — || September 3, 2007 || Catalina || CSS || HYG || align=right | 3.6 km || 
|-id=017 bgcolor=#d6d6d6
| 274017 ||  || — || September 3, 2007 || Catalina || CSS || LIX || align=right | 4.2 km || 
|-id=018 bgcolor=#d6d6d6
| 274018 ||  || — || September 5, 2007 || Dauban || Chante-Perdrix Obs. || EOS || align=right | 2.9 km || 
|-id=019 bgcolor=#d6d6d6
| 274019 ||  || — || September 12, 2007 || Hibiscus || S. F. Hönig, N. Teamo || — || align=right | 4.4 km || 
|-id=020 bgcolor=#d6d6d6
| 274020 Skywalker ||  ||  || September 12, 2007 || Taunus || S. Karge, E. Schwab || — || align=right | 4.2 km || 
|-id=021 bgcolor=#d6d6d6
| 274021 ||  || — || September 12, 2007 || Gaisberg || R. Gierlinger || VER || align=right | 3.5 km || 
|-id=022 bgcolor=#d6d6d6
| 274022 ||  || — || September 13, 2007 || Dauban || Chante-Perdrix Obs. || — || align=right | 3.0 km || 
|-id=023 bgcolor=#d6d6d6
| 274023 ||  || — || September 3, 2007 || Catalina || CSS || — || align=right | 3.2 km || 
|-id=024 bgcolor=#d6d6d6
| 274024 ||  || — || September 3, 2007 || Catalina || CSS || — || align=right | 3.5 km || 
|-id=025 bgcolor=#d6d6d6
| 274025 ||  || — || September 3, 2007 || Catalina || CSS || — || align=right | 4.9 km || 
|-id=026 bgcolor=#d6d6d6
| 274026 ||  || — || September 4, 2007 || Catalina || CSS || slow || align=right | 7.0 km || 
|-id=027 bgcolor=#d6d6d6
| 274027 ||  || — || September 9, 2007 || Kitt Peak || Spacewatch || — || align=right | 4.7 km || 
|-id=028 bgcolor=#d6d6d6
| 274028 ||  || — || September 10, 2007 || Mount Lemmon || Mount Lemmon Survey || LIX || align=right | 4.5 km || 
|-id=029 bgcolor=#d6d6d6
| 274029 ||  || — || September 10, 2007 || Mount Lemmon || Mount Lemmon Survey || — || align=right | 2.1 km || 
|-id=030 bgcolor=#d6d6d6
| 274030 ||  || — || September 10, 2007 || Kitt Peak || Spacewatch || — || align=right | 4.0 km || 
|-id=031 bgcolor=#d6d6d6
| 274031 ||  || — || September 11, 2007 || Kitt Peak || Spacewatch || — || align=right | 2.8 km || 
|-id=032 bgcolor=#d6d6d6
| 274032 ||  || — || September 12, 2007 || Mount Lemmon || Mount Lemmon Survey || SHU3:2 || align=right | 5.4 km || 
|-id=033 bgcolor=#d6d6d6
| 274033 ||  || — || September 12, 2007 || Catalina || CSS || HYG || align=right | 5.0 km || 
|-id=034 bgcolor=#d6d6d6
| 274034 ||  || — || September 14, 2007 || Mount Lemmon || Mount Lemmon Survey || — || align=right | 4.3 km || 
|-id=035 bgcolor=#d6d6d6
| 274035 ||  || — || September 14, 2007 || Socorro || LINEAR || URS || align=right | 5.6 km || 
|-id=036 bgcolor=#d6d6d6
| 274036 ||  || — || September 10, 2007 || Kitt Peak || Spacewatch || — || align=right | 4.3 km || 
|-id=037 bgcolor=#d6d6d6
| 274037 ||  || — || September 9, 2007 || Anderson Mesa || LONEOS || — || align=right | 3.8 km || 
|-id=038 bgcolor=#d6d6d6
| 274038 ||  || — || September 10, 2007 || Kitt Peak || Spacewatch || — || align=right | 4.9 km || 
|-id=039 bgcolor=#d6d6d6
| 274039 ||  || — || September 11, 2007 || Mount Lemmon || Mount Lemmon Survey || — || align=right | 2.5 km || 
|-id=040 bgcolor=#d6d6d6
| 274040 ||  || — || September 12, 2007 || Kitt Peak || Spacewatch || — || align=right | 4.8 km || 
|-id=041 bgcolor=#d6d6d6
| 274041 ||  || — || September 12, 2007 || Kitt Peak || Spacewatch || — || align=right | 3.8 km || 
|-id=042 bgcolor=#d6d6d6
| 274042 ||  || — || September 6, 2007 || Siding Spring || SSS || — || align=right | 4.7 km || 
|-id=043 bgcolor=#d6d6d6
| 274043 ||  || — || September 8, 2007 || Siding Spring || SSS || — || align=right | 4.6 km || 
|-id=044 bgcolor=#d6d6d6
| 274044 ||  || — || September 9, 2007 || Anderson Mesa || LONEOS || — || align=right | 4.7 km || 
|-id=045 bgcolor=#d6d6d6
| 274045 ||  || — || September 14, 2007 || Mount Lemmon || Mount Lemmon Survey || — || align=right | 3.7 km || 
|-id=046 bgcolor=#d6d6d6
| 274046 ||  || — || September 6, 2007 || Siding Spring || SSS || — || align=right | 3.3 km || 
|-id=047 bgcolor=#d6d6d6
| 274047 ||  || — || September 5, 2007 || Anderson Mesa || LONEOS || — || align=right | 4.8 km || 
|-id=048 bgcolor=#d6d6d6
| 274048 ||  || — || September 11, 2007 || Catalina || CSS || LIX || align=right | 6.5 km || 
|-id=049 bgcolor=#d6d6d6
| 274049 ||  || — || September 9, 2007 || Mount Lemmon || Mount Lemmon Survey || 7:4 || align=right | 6.8 km || 
|-id=050 bgcolor=#d6d6d6
| 274050 ||  || — || September 13, 2007 || Socorro || LINEAR || — || align=right | 4.1 km || 
|-id=051 bgcolor=#d6d6d6
| 274051 ||  || — || September 13, 2007 || Socorro || LINEAR || — || align=right | 3.7 km || 
|-id=052 bgcolor=#d6d6d6
| 274052 ||  || — || September 19, 2007 || Mayhill || A. Lowe || — || align=right | 3.5 km || 
|-id=053 bgcolor=#fefefe
| 274053 ||  || — || September 25, 2007 || Mount Lemmon || Mount Lemmon Survey || — || align=right | 1.0 km || 
|-id=054 bgcolor=#d6d6d6
| 274054 ||  || — || October 6, 2007 || Bergisch Gladbach || W. Bickel || — || align=right | 4.8 km || 
|-id=055 bgcolor=#fefefe
| 274055 ||  || — || October 9, 2007 || Catalina || CSS || H || align=right data-sort-value="0.97" | 970 m || 
|-id=056 bgcolor=#d6d6d6
| 274056 ||  || — || October 11, 2007 || Eskridge || G. Hug || 3:2 || align=right | 5.4 km || 
|-id=057 bgcolor=#d6d6d6
| 274057 ||  || — || October 5, 2007 || Kitt Peak || Spacewatch || LIX || align=right | 4.9 km || 
|-id=058 bgcolor=#d6d6d6
| 274058 ||  || — || October 13, 2007 || Altschwendt || W. Ries || — || align=right | 3.6 km || 
|-id=059 bgcolor=#d6d6d6
| 274059 ||  || — || October 7, 2007 || Catalina || CSS || 7:4 || align=right | 5.4 km || 
|-id=060 bgcolor=#d6d6d6
| 274060 ||  || — || October 8, 2007 || Catalina || CSS || 3:2 || align=right | 5.9 km || 
|-id=061 bgcolor=#d6d6d6
| 274061 ||  || — || October 8, 2007 || Kitt Peak || Spacewatch || — || align=right | 3.5 km || 
|-id=062 bgcolor=#d6d6d6
| 274062 ||  || — || October 7, 2007 || Socorro || LINEAR || EUP || align=right | 5.2 km || 
|-id=063 bgcolor=#d6d6d6
| 274063 ||  || — || October 9, 2007 || Socorro || LINEAR || — || align=right | 3.7 km || 
|-id=064 bgcolor=#d6d6d6
| 274064 ||  || — || October 11, 2007 || Kitt Peak || Spacewatch || VER || align=right | 4.5 km || 
|-id=065 bgcolor=#d6d6d6
| 274065 ||  || — || October 8, 2007 || Mount Lemmon || Mount Lemmon Survey || THM || align=right | 3.0 km || 
|-id=066 bgcolor=#E9E9E9
| 274066 ||  || — || October 11, 2007 || Mount Lemmon || Mount Lemmon Survey || — || align=right | 1.8 km || 
|-id=067 bgcolor=#fefefe
| 274067 ||  || — || October 15, 2007 || Catalina || CSS || H || align=right data-sort-value="0.72" | 720 m || 
|-id=068 bgcolor=#d6d6d6
| 274068 ||  || — || October 11, 2007 || Catalina || CSS || — || align=right | 4.9 km || 
|-id=069 bgcolor=#FA8072
| 274069 ||  || — || November 12, 2007 || Socorro || LINEAR || — || align=right data-sort-value="0.98" | 980 m || 
|-id=070 bgcolor=#fefefe
| 274070 ||  || — || November 4, 2007 || Mount Lemmon || Mount Lemmon Survey || H || align=right data-sort-value="0.96" | 960 m || 
|-id=071 bgcolor=#fefefe
| 274071 ||  || — || December 3, 2007 || Catalina || CSS || — || align=right data-sort-value="0.88" | 880 m || 
|-id=072 bgcolor=#fefefe
| 274072 ||  || — || December 8, 2007 || Bisei SG Center || BATTeRS || FLO || align=right | 1.3 km || 
|-id=073 bgcolor=#fefefe
| 274073 ||  || — || December 15, 2007 || Catalina || CSS || — || align=right | 1.4 km || 
|-id=074 bgcolor=#fefefe
| 274074 ||  || — || December 10, 2007 || Socorro || LINEAR || — || align=right | 1.1 km || 
|-id=075 bgcolor=#fefefe
| 274075 ||  || — || December 13, 2007 || Socorro || LINEAR || — || align=right | 1.4 km || 
|-id=076 bgcolor=#fefefe
| 274076 ||  || — || December 16, 2007 || Kitt Peak || Spacewatch || NYS || align=right data-sort-value="0.78" | 780 m || 
|-id=077 bgcolor=#d6d6d6
| 274077 ||  || — || December 28, 2007 || Kitt Peak || Spacewatch || — || align=right | 3.5 km || 
|-id=078 bgcolor=#fefefe
| 274078 ||  || — || December 30, 2007 || Kitt Peak || Spacewatch || — || align=right data-sort-value="0.83" | 830 m || 
|-id=079 bgcolor=#fefefe
| 274079 ||  || — || January 10, 2008 || Mount Lemmon || Mount Lemmon Survey || — || align=right | 1.1 km || 
|-id=080 bgcolor=#fefefe
| 274080 ||  || — || January 10, 2008 || Mount Lemmon || Mount Lemmon Survey || MAS || align=right data-sort-value="0.71" | 710 m || 
|-id=081 bgcolor=#fefefe
| 274081 ||  || — || January 11, 2008 || Kitt Peak || Spacewatch || V || align=right data-sort-value="0.89" | 890 m || 
|-id=082 bgcolor=#fefefe
| 274082 ||  || — || January 11, 2008 || Kitt Peak || Spacewatch || — || align=right data-sort-value="0.65" | 650 m || 
|-id=083 bgcolor=#fefefe
| 274083 ||  || — || January 13, 2008 || Kitt Peak || Spacewatch || — || align=right | 1.0 km || 
|-id=084 bgcolor=#fefefe
| 274084 Baldone ||  ||  || January 3, 2008 || Baldone || K. Černis, I. Eglītis || ERI || align=right | 1.9 km || 
|-id=085 bgcolor=#fefefe
| 274085 ||  || — || January 12, 2008 || Catalina || CSS || H || align=right data-sort-value="0.72" | 720 m || 
|-id=086 bgcolor=#fefefe
| 274086 ||  || — || January 31, 2008 || Mount Lemmon || Mount Lemmon Survey || MAS || align=right data-sort-value="0.74" | 740 m || 
|-id=087 bgcolor=#fefefe
| 274087 ||  || — || January 31, 2008 || Catalina || CSS || H || align=right data-sort-value="0.78" | 780 m || 
|-id=088 bgcolor=#fefefe
| 274088 ||  || — || January 19, 2008 || Mount Lemmon || Mount Lemmon Survey || FLO || align=right data-sort-value="0.77" | 770 m || 
|-id=089 bgcolor=#fefefe
| 274089 ||  || — || February 3, 2008 || Kitt Peak || Spacewatch || — || align=right | 1.0 km || 
|-id=090 bgcolor=#fefefe
| 274090 ||  || — || February 7, 2008 || Kitt Peak || Spacewatch || V || align=right data-sort-value="0.74" | 740 m || 
|-id=091 bgcolor=#fefefe
| 274091 ||  || — || February 8, 2008 || Kitt Peak || Spacewatch || H || align=right data-sort-value="0.87" | 870 m || 
|-id=092 bgcolor=#fefefe
| 274092 ||  || — || February 9, 2008 || Socorro || LINEAR || H || align=right data-sort-value="0.81" | 810 m || 
|-id=093 bgcolor=#fefefe
| 274093 ||  || — || February 6, 2008 || Catalina || CSS || ERI || align=right | 2.1 km || 
|-id=094 bgcolor=#fefefe
| 274094 ||  || — || February 8, 2008 || Kitt Peak || Spacewatch || FLO || align=right data-sort-value="0.77" | 770 m || 
|-id=095 bgcolor=#fefefe
| 274095 ||  || — || February 8, 2008 || Mount Lemmon || Mount Lemmon Survey || — || align=right | 1.1 km || 
|-id=096 bgcolor=#fefefe
| 274096 ||  || — || February 10, 2008 || Mount Lemmon || Mount Lemmon Survey || — || align=right data-sort-value="0.89" | 890 m || 
|-id=097 bgcolor=#fefefe
| 274097 ||  || — || February 8, 2008 || Kitt Peak || Spacewatch || NYS || align=right data-sort-value="0.79" | 790 m || 
|-id=098 bgcolor=#fefefe
| 274098 ||  || — || February 9, 2008 || Mount Lemmon || Mount Lemmon Survey || — || align=right data-sort-value="0.95" | 950 m || 
|-id=099 bgcolor=#fefefe
| 274099 ||  || — || February 12, 2008 || Siding Spring || SSS || H || align=right data-sort-value="0.83" | 830 m || 
|-id=100 bgcolor=#fefefe
| 274100 ||  || — || February 13, 2008 || Anderson Mesa || LONEOS || — || align=right | 1.1 km || 
|}

274101–274200 

|-bgcolor=#fefefe
| 274101 ||  || — || February 10, 2008 || Catalina || CSS || — || align=right | 3.5 km || 
|-id=102 bgcolor=#fefefe
| 274102 ||  || — || February 9, 2008 || Mount Lemmon || Mount Lemmon Survey || — || align=right data-sort-value="0.63" | 630 m || 
|-id=103 bgcolor=#fefefe
| 274103 ||  || — || February 10, 2008 || Mount Lemmon || Mount Lemmon Survey || — || align=right data-sort-value="0.77" | 770 m || 
|-id=104 bgcolor=#fefefe
| 274104 ||  || — || February 13, 2008 || Mount Lemmon || Mount Lemmon Survey || MAS || align=right data-sort-value="0.90" | 900 m || 
|-id=105 bgcolor=#fefefe
| 274105 ||  || — || February 26, 2008 || Wildberg || R. Apitzsch || V || align=right data-sort-value="0.62" | 620 m || 
|-id=106 bgcolor=#fefefe
| 274106 ||  || — || February 27, 2008 || Mount Lemmon || Mount Lemmon Survey || FLO || align=right data-sort-value="0.64" | 640 m || 
|-id=107 bgcolor=#fefefe
| 274107 ||  || — || February 28, 2008 || Mount Lemmon || Mount Lemmon Survey || — || align=right data-sort-value="0.95" | 950 m || 
|-id=108 bgcolor=#fefefe
| 274108 ||  || — || February 29, 2008 || Catalina || CSS || H || align=right data-sort-value="0.89" | 890 m || 
|-id=109 bgcolor=#fefefe
| 274109 ||  || — || February 26, 2008 || Socorro || LINEAR || H || align=right | 1.1 km || 
|-id=110 bgcolor=#fefefe
| 274110 ||  || — || February 26, 2008 || Kitt Peak || Spacewatch || — || align=right data-sort-value="0.83" | 830 m || 
|-id=111 bgcolor=#E9E9E9
| 274111 ||  || — || February 26, 2008 || Mount Lemmon || Mount Lemmon Survey || AEO || align=right | 1.5 km || 
|-id=112 bgcolor=#fefefe
| 274112 ||  || — || February 27, 2008 || Mount Lemmon || Mount Lemmon Survey || MAS || align=right data-sort-value="0.84" | 840 m || 
|-id=113 bgcolor=#E9E9E9
| 274113 ||  || — || February 28, 2008 || Kitt Peak || Spacewatch || — || align=right | 2.8 km || 
|-id=114 bgcolor=#fefefe
| 274114 ||  || — || February 28, 2008 || Mount Lemmon || Mount Lemmon Survey || FLO || align=right data-sort-value="0.81" | 810 m || 
|-id=115 bgcolor=#d6d6d6
| 274115 ||  || — || February 29, 2008 || Kitt Peak || Spacewatch || — || align=right | 3.7 km || 
|-id=116 bgcolor=#fefefe
| 274116 ||  || — || February 27, 2008 || Mount Lemmon || Mount Lemmon Survey || — || align=right data-sort-value="0.90" | 900 m || 
|-id=117 bgcolor=#fefefe
| 274117 ||  || — || February 28, 2008 || Mount Lemmon || Mount Lemmon Survey || NYS || align=right data-sort-value="0.70" | 700 m || 
|-id=118 bgcolor=#E9E9E9
| 274118 ||  || — || February 29, 2008 || Kitt Peak || Spacewatch || GEF || align=right | 1.5 km || 
|-id=119 bgcolor=#E9E9E9
| 274119 ||  || — || February 18, 2008 || Mount Lemmon || Mount Lemmon Survey || — || align=right | 3.7 km || 
|-id=120 bgcolor=#fefefe
| 274120 ||  || — || March 1, 2008 || Mount Lemmon || Mount Lemmon Survey || — || align=right | 1.1 km || 
|-id=121 bgcolor=#E9E9E9
| 274121 ||  || — || March 4, 2008 || Kitt Peak || Spacewatch || — || align=right | 2.9 km || 
|-id=122 bgcolor=#fefefe
| 274122 ||  || — || March 4, 2008 || Mount Lemmon || Mount Lemmon Survey || NYS || align=right data-sort-value="0.77" | 770 m || 
|-id=123 bgcolor=#fefefe
| 274123 ||  || — || March 5, 2008 || Mount Lemmon || Mount Lemmon Survey || — || align=right data-sort-value="0.94" | 940 m || 
|-id=124 bgcolor=#fefefe
| 274124 ||  || — || March 5, 2008 || Kitt Peak || Spacewatch || — || align=right | 1.2 km || 
|-id=125 bgcolor=#fefefe
| 274125 ||  || — || March 5, 2008 || Kitt Peak || Spacewatch || — || align=right | 1.1 km || 
|-id=126 bgcolor=#fefefe
| 274126 ||  || — || March 6, 2008 || Kitt Peak || Spacewatch || — || align=right | 1.2 km || 
|-id=127 bgcolor=#d6d6d6
| 274127 ||  || — || March 6, 2008 || Kitt Peak || Spacewatch || — || align=right | 4.2 km || 
|-id=128 bgcolor=#fefefe
| 274128 ||  || — || March 8, 2008 || Catalina || CSS || FLO || align=right data-sort-value="0.83" | 830 m || 
|-id=129 bgcolor=#d6d6d6
| 274129 ||  || — || March 8, 2008 || Socorro || LINEAR || — || align=right | 5.0 km || 
|-id=130 bgcolor=#fefefe
| 274130 ||  || — || March 7, 2008 || Catalina || CSS || — || align=right data-sort-value="0.85" | 850 m || 
|-id=131 bgcolor=#fefefe
| 274131 ||  || — || March 9, 2008 || Kitt Peak || Spacewatch || — || align=right data-sort-value="0.84" | 840 m || 
|-id=132 bgcolor=#fefefe
| 274132 ||  || — || March 11, 2008 || Kitt Peak || Spacewatch || NYS || align=right data-sort-value="0.65" | 650 m || 
|-id=133 bgcolor=#fefefe
| 274133 ||  || — || March 11, 2008 || Kitt Peak || Spacewatch || — || align=right data-sort-value="0.71" | 710 m || 
|-id=134 bgcolor=#fefefe
| 274134 ||  || — || March 9, 2008 || Kitt Peak || Spacewatch || FLO || align=right data-sort-value="0.79" | 790 m || 
|-id=135 bgcolor=#fefefe
| 274135 ||  || — || March 25, 2008 || Kitt Peak || Spacewatch || NYS || align=right data-sort-value="0.74" | 740 m || 
|-id=136 bgcolor=#fefefe
| 274136 ||  || — || March 28, 2008 || Grove Creek || F. Tozzi || NYS || align=right data-sort-value="0.94" | 940 m || 
|-id=137 bgcolor=#d6d6d6
| 274137 Angelaglinos ||  ||  || March 28, 2008 || Jarnac || Jarnac Obs. || — || align=right | 6.0 km || 
|-id=138 bgcolor=#FFC2E0
| 274138 ||  || — || March 29, 2008 || Catalina || CSS || APO +1km || align=right data-sort-value="0.75" | 750 m || 
|-id=139 bgcolor=#E9E9E9
| 274139 ||  || — || March 26, 2008 || Kitt Peak || Spacewatch || RAF || align=right | 1.5 km || 
|-id=140 bgcolor=#fefefe
| 274140 ||  || — || March 27, 2008 || Kitt Peak || Spacewatch || MAS || align=right data-sort-value="0.82" | 820 m || 
|-id=141 bgcolor=#fefefe
| 274141 ||  || — || March 28, 2008 || Kitt Peak || Spacewatch || — || align=right | 1.2 km || 
|-id=142 bgcolor=#fefefe
| 274142 ||  || — || March 28, 2008 || Mount Lemmon || Mount Lemmon Survey || FLO || align=right data-sort-value="0.72" | 720 m || 
|-id=143 bgcolor=#fefefe
| 274143 ||  || — || March 28, 2008 || Mount Lemmon || Mount Lemmon Survey || — || align=right data-sort-value="0.83" | 830 m || 
|-id=144 bgcolor=#d6d6d6
| 274144 ||  || — || March 29, 2008 || Catalina || CSS || — || align=right | 4.0 km || 
|-id=145 bgcolor=#fefefe
| 274145 ||  || — || March 28, 2008 || Mount Lemmon || Mount Lemmon Survey || — || align=right data-sort-value="0.74" | 740 m || 
|-id=146 bgcolor=#fefefe
| 274146 ||  || — || March 28, 2008 || Kitt Peak || Spacewatch || — || align=right | 1.0 km || 
|-id=147 bgcolor=#fefefe
| 274147 ||  || — || March 28, 2008 || Kitt Peak || Spacewatch || FLO || align=right data-sort-value="0.66" | 660 m || 
|-id=148 bgcolor=#fefefe
| 274148 ||  || — || March 28, 2008 || Kitt Peak || Spacewatch || — || align=right data-sort-value="0.82" | 820 m || 
|-id=149 bgcolor=#d6d6d6
| 274149 ||  || — || March 28, 2008 || Kitt Peak || Spacewatch || — || align=right | 3.5 km || 
|-id=150 bgcolor=#fefefe
| 274150 ||  || — || March 28, 2008 || Mount Lemmon || Mount Lemmon Survey || — || align=right | 1.1 km || 
|-id=151 bgcolor=#E9E9E9
| 274151 ||  || — || March 28, 2008 || Kitt Peak || Spacewatch || — || align=right | 1.8 km || 
|-id=152 bgcolor=#fefefe
| 274152 ||  || — || March 31, 2008 || Mount Lemmon || Mount Lemmon Survey || — || align=right data-sort-value="0.78" | 780 m || 
|-id=153 bgcolor=#fefefe
| 274153 ||  || — || March 27, 2008 || Kitt Peak || Spacewatch || — || align=right data-sort-value="0.70" | 700 m || 
|-id=154 bgcolor=#E9E9E9
| 274154 ||  || — || March 30, 2008 || Kitt Peak || Spacewatch || — || align=right | 2.0 km || 
|-id=155 bgcolor=#fefefe
| 274155 ||  || — || March 30, 2008 || Kitt Peak || Spacewatch || V || align=right data-sort-value="0.75" | 750 m || 
|-id=156 bgcolor=#fefefe
| 274156 ||  || — || March 30, 2008 || Kitt Peak || Spacewatch || FLO || align=right data-sort-value="0.59" | 590 m || 
|-id=157 bgcolor=#E9E9E9
| 274157 ||  || — || March 30, 2008 || Kitt Peak || Spacewatch || — || align=right | 1.2 km || 
|-id=158 bgcolor=#fefefe
| 274158 ||  || — || March 30, 2008 || Kitt Peak || Spacewatch || — || align=right | 1.1 km || 
|-id=159 bgcolor=#fefefe
| 274159 ||  || — || March 31, 2008 || Kitt Peak || Spacewatch || — || align=right data-sort-value="0.85" | 850 m || 
|-id=160 bgcolor=#d6d6d6
| 274160 ||  || — || March 31, 2008 || Kitt Peak || Spacewatch || — || align=right | 4.4 km || 
|-id=161 bgcolor=#d6d6d6
| 274161 ||  || — || March 31, 2008 || Mount Lemmon || Mount Lemmon Survey || KOR || align=right | 1.7 km || 
|-id=162 bgcolor=#fefefe
| 274162 ||  || — || March 29, 2008 || Kitt Peak || Spacewatch || — || align=right data-sort-value="0.65" | 650 m || 
|-id=163 bgcolor=#fefefe
| 274163 ||  || — || March 31, 2008 || Kitt Peak || Spacewatch || — || align=right data-sort-value="0.79" | 790 m || 
|-id=164 bgcolor=#fefefe
| 274164 ||  || — || March 31, 2008 || Kitt Peak || Spacewatch || — || align=right data-sort-value="0.94" | 940 m || 
|-id=165 bgcolor=#fefefe
| 274165 ||  || — || March 29, 2008 || Mount Lemmon || Mount Lemmon Survey || — || align=right data-sort-value="0.71" | 710 m || 
|-id=166 bgcolor=#fefefe
| 274166 ||  || — || March 30, 2008 || Kitt Peak || Spacewatch || — || align=right data-sort-value="0.89" | 890 m || 
|-id=167 bgcolor=#fefefe
| 274167 ||  || — || March 29, 2008 || Kitt Peak || Spacewatch || — || align=right data-sort-value="0.90" | 900 m || 
|-id=168 bgcolor=#fefefe
| 274168 ||  || — || April 1, 2008 || Kitt Peak || Spacewatch || — || align=right | 1.0 km || 
|-id=169 bgcolor=#fefefe
| 274169 ||  || — || April 3, 2008 || Mount Lemmon || Mount Lemmon Survey || — || align=right data-sort-value="0.70" | 700 m || 
|-id=170 bgcolor=#fefefe
| 274170 ||  || — || April 3, 2008 || Kitt Peak || Spacewatch || FLO || align=right data-sort-value="0.78" | 780 m || 
|-id=171 bgcolor=#fefefe
| 274171 ||  || — || April 4, 2008 || Kitt Peak || Spacewatch || FLO || align=right data-sort-value="0.71" | 710 m || 
|-id=172 bgcolor=#E9E9E9
| 274172 ||  || — || April 4, 2008 || Kitt Peak || Spacewatch || RAF || align=right | 1.2 km || 
|-id=173 bgcolor=#fefefe
| 274173 ||  || — || April 5, 2008 || Catalina || CSS || NYS || align=right data-sort-value="0.88" | 880 m || 
|-id=174 bgcolor=#fefefe
| 274174 ||  || — || April 6, 2008 || Kitt Peak || Spacewatch || — || align=right | 1.2 km || 
|-id=175 bgcolor=#fefefe
| 274175 ||  || — || April 6, 2008 || Kitt Peak || Spacewatch || — || align=right data-sort-value="0.87" | 870 m || 
|-id=176 bgcolor=#fefefe
| 274176 ||  || — || April 6, 2008 || Kitt Peak || Spacewatch || — || align=right | 1.00 km || 
|-id=177 bgcolor=#fefefe
| 274177 ||  || — || April 6, 2008 || Kitt Peak || Spacewatch || — || align=right data-sort-value="0.78" | 780 m || 
|-id=178 bgcolor=#fefefe
| 274178 ||  || — || April 6, 2008 || Kitt Peak || Spacewatch || — || align=right | 1.3 km || 
|-id=179 bgcolor=#fefefe
| 274179 ||  || — || April 6, 2008 || Mount Lemmon || Mount Lemmon Survey || FLO || align=right data-sort-value="0.67" | 670 m || 
|-id=180 bgcolor=#fefefe
| 274180 ||  || — || April 6, 2008 || Mount Lemmon || Mount Lemmon Survey || — || align=right data-sort-value="0.70" | 700 m || 
|-id=181 bgcolor=#fefefe
| 274181 ||  || — || April 7, 2008 || Kitt Peak || Spacewatch || FLO || align=right data-sort-value="0.67" | 670 m || 
|-id=182 bgcolor=#d6d6d6
| 274182 ||  || — || April 8, 2008 || Mount Lemmon || Mount Lemmon Survey || — || align=right | 3.4 km || 
|-id=183 bgcolor=#fefefe
| 274183 ||  || — || April 6, 2008 || Mount Lemmon || Mount Lemmon Survey || — || align=right data-sort-value="0.96" | 960 m || 
|-id=184 bgcolor=#fefefe
| 274184 ||  || — || April 11, 2008 || Kitt Peak || Spacewatch || — || align=right data-sort-value="0.86" | 860 m || 
|-id=185 bgcolor=#d6d6d6
| 274185 ||  || — || April 11, 2008 || Kitt Peak || Spacewatch || — || align=right | 3.4 km || 
|-id=186 bgcolor=#fefefe
| 274186 ||  || — || April 11, 2008 || Catalina || CSS || — || align=right data-sort-value="0.99" | 990 m || 
|-id=187 bgcolor=#fefefe
| 274187 ||  || — || April 11, 2008 || Kitt Peak || Spacewatch || V || align=right data-sort-value="0.59" | 590 m || 
|-id=188 bgcolor=#fefefe
| 274188 ||  || — || April 14, 2008 || Mount Lemmon || Mount Lemmon Survey || V || align=right data-sort-value="0.69" | 690 m || 
|-id=189 bgcolor=#fefefe
| 274189 ||  || — || April 7, 2008 || Kitt Peak || Spacewatch || — || align=right data-sort-value="0.70" | 700 m || 
|-id=190 bgcolor=#fefefe
| 274190 ||  || — || April 14, 2008 || Kitt Peak || Spacewatch || — || align=right data-sort-value="0.65" | 650 m || 
|-id=191 bgcolor=#fefefe
| 274191 ||  || — || April 28, 2008 || La Sagra || OAM Obs. || NYS || align=right data-sort-value="0.91" | 910 m || 
|-id=192 bgcolor=#fefefe
| 274192 ||  || — || April 24, 2008 || Kitt Peak || Spacewatch || — || align=right data-sort-value="0.74" | 740 m || 
|-id=193 bgcolor=#fefefe
| 274193 ||  || — || April 24, 2008 || Kitt Peak || Spacewatch || — || align=right data-sort-value="0.96" | 960 m || 
|-id=194 bgcolor=#fefefe
| 274194 ||  || — || April 25, 2008 || Kitt Peak || Spacewatch || — || align=right data-sort-value="0.94" | 940 m || 
|-id=195 bgcolor=#fefefe
| 274195 ||  || — || April 25, 2008 || Kitt Peak || Spacewatch || MAS || align=right data-sort-value="0.72" | 720 m || 
|-id=196 bgcolor=#fefefe
| 274196 ||  || — || April 26, 2008 || Kitt Peak || Spacewatch || FLO || align=right data-sort-value="0.63" | 630 m || 
|-id=197 bgcolor=#fefefe
| 274197 ||  || — || April 26, 2008 || Kitt Peak || Spacewatch || — || align=right | 1.0 km || 
|-id=198 bgcolor=#fefefe
| 274198 ||  || — || April 27, 2008 || Kitt Peak || Spacewatch || — || align=right | 1.0 km || 
|-id=199 bgcolor=#E9E9E9
| 274199 ||  || — || April 29, 2008 || Kitt Peak || Spacewatch || — || align=right | 2.5 km || 
|-id=200 bgcolor=#fefefe
| 274200 ||  || — || April 26, 2008 || Kitt Peak || Spacewatch || — || align=right | 1.1 km || 
|}

274201–274300 

|-bgcolor=#fefefe
| 274201 ||  || — || April 27, 2008 || Kitt Peak || Spacewatch || — || align=right data-sort-value="0.92" | 920 m || 
|-id=202 bgcolor=#fefefe
| 274202 ||  || — || April 27, 2008 || Mount Lemmon || Mount Lemmon Survey || MAS || align=right data-sort-value="0.82" | 820 m || 
|-id=203 bgcolor=#fefefe
| 274203 ||  || — || April 28, 2008 || Kitt Peak || Spacewatch || — || align=right data-sort-value="0.75" | 750 m || 
|-id=204 bgcolor=#fefefe
| 274204 ||  || — || April 29, 2008 || Kitt Peak || Spacewatch || — || align=right data-sort-value="0.75" | 750 m || 
|-id=205 bgcolor=#fefefe
| 274205 ||  || — || April 29, 2008 || Mount Lemmon || Mount Lemmon Survey || — || align=right data-sort-value="0.62" | 620 m || 
|-id=206 bgcolor=#E9E9E9
| 274206 ||  || — || April 29, 2008 || Kitt Peak || Spacewatch || — || align=right | 1.5 km || 
|-id=207 bgcolor=#fefefe
| 274207 ||  || — || April 30, 2008 || Mount Lemmon || Mount Lemmon Survey || — || align=right data-sort-value="0.83" | 830 m || 
|-id=208 bgcolor=#fefefe
| 274208 ||  || — || April 30, 2008 || Kitt Peak || Spacewatch || V || align=right data-sort-value="0.71" | 710 m || 
|-id=209 bgcolor=#fefefe
| 274209 ||  || — || April 30, 2008 || Kitt Peak || Spacewatch || — || align=right | 1.1 km || 
|-id=210 bgcolor=#fefefe
| 274210 ||  || — || April 26, 2008 || Kitt Peak || Spacewatch || FLO || align=right data-sort-value="0.64" | 640 m || 
|-id=211 bgcolor=#fefefe
| 274211 ||  || — || April 30, 2008 || Mount Lemmon || Mount Lemmon Survey || — || align=right data-sort-value="0.80" | 800 m || 
|-id=212 bgcolor=#fefefe
| 274212 || 2008 JX || — || May 1, 2008 || Mount Lemmon || Mount Lemmon Survey || MAS || align=right data-sort-value="0.77" | 770 m || 
|-id=213 bgcolor=#fefefe
| 274213 Satriani ||  ||  || May 5, 2008 || Nogales || J.-C. Merlin || — || align=right data-sort-value="0.73" | 730 m || 
|-id=214 bgcolor=#E9E9E9
| 274214 ||  || — || May 2, 2008 || Kitt Peak || Spacewatch || — || align=right data-sort-value="0.94" | 940 m || 
|-id=215 bgcolor=#fefefe
| 274215 ||  || — || May 2, 2008 || Kitt Peak || Spacewatch || FLO || align=right data-sort-value="0.62" | 620 m || 
|-id=216 bgcolor=#fefefe
| 274216 ||  || — || May 3, 2008 || Mount Lemmon || Mount Lemmon Survey || V || align=right data-sort-value="0.79" | 790 m || 
|-id=217 bgcolor=#fefefe
| 274217 ||  || — || May 13, 2008 || Mount Lemmon || Mount Lemmon Survey || — || align=right | 1.2 km || 
|-id=218 bgcolor=#fefefe
| 274218 ||  || — || May 11, 2008 || Kitt Peak || Spacewatch || — || align=right data-sort-value="0.73" | 730 m || 
|-id=219 bgcolor=#d6d6d6
| 274219 ||  || — || May 3, 2008 || Mount Lemmon || Mount Lemmon Survey || EOS || align=right | 2.1 km || 
|-id=220 bgcolor=#fefefe
| 274220 ||  || — || May 3, 2008 || Mount Lemmon || Mount Lemmon Survey || NYS || align=right data-sort-value="0.73" | 730 m || 
|-id=221 bgcolor=#fefefe
| 274221 ||  || — || May 13, 2008 || Mount Lemmon || Mount Lemmon Survey || — || align=right data-sort-value="0.64" | 640 m || 
|-id=222 bgcolor=#fefefe
| 274222 ||  || — || May 15, 2008 || Kitt Peak || Spacewatch || — || align=right data-sort-value="0.90" | 900 m || 
|-id=223 bgcolor=#fefefe
| 274223 ||  || — || May 27, 2008 || Kitt Peak || Spacewatch || — || align=right | 1.2 km || 
|-id=224 bgcolor=#fefefe
| 274224 ||  || — || May 28, 2008 || Kitt Peak || Spacewatch || — || align=right data-sort-value="0.78" | 780 m || 
|-id=225 bgcolor=#d6d6d6
| 274225 ||  || — || May 28, 2008 || Mount Lemmon || Mount Lemmon Survey || EUP || align=right | 4.7 km || 
|-id=226 bgcolor=#fefefe
| 274226 ||  || — || May 29, 2008 || Kitt Peak || Spacewatch || — || align=right data-sort-value="0.79" | 790 m || 
|-id=227 bgcolor=#fefefe
| 274227 ||  || — || May 29, 2008 || Kitt Peak || Spacewatch || — || align=right data-sort-value="0.94" | 940 m || 
|-id=228 bgcolor=#fefefe
| 274228 ||  || — || May 29, 2008 || Kitt Peak || Spacewatch || FLO || align=right data-sort-value="0.53" | 530 m || 
|-id=229 bgcolor=#fefefe
| 274229 ||  || — || May 31, 2008 || Mount Lemmon || Mount Lemmon Survey || — || align=right | 1.0 km || 
|-id=230 bgcolor=#E9E9E9
| 274230 ||  || — || May 29, 2008 || Kitt Peak || Spacewatch || — || align=right | 3.0 km || 
|-id=231 bgcolor=#fefefe
| 274231 ||  || — || May 29, 2008 || Grove Creek || F. Tozzi || FLO || align=right data-sort-value="0.89" | 890 m || 
|-id=232 bgcolor=#fefefe
| 274232 ||  || — || June 2, 2008 || Sierra Stars || W. G. Dillon, D. Wells || V || align=right data-sort-value="0.93" | 930 m || 
|-id=233 bgcolor=#fefefe
| 274233 ||  || — || June 9, 2008 || Kitt Peak || Spacewatch || — || align=right | 1.1 km || 
|-id=234 bgcolor=#FA8072
| 274234 ||  || — || June 13, 2008 || Calvin-Rehoboth || Calvin–Rehoboth Obs. || — || align=right data-sort-value="0.84" | 840 m || 
|-id=235 bgcolor=#E9E9E9
| 274235 ||  || — || June 30, 2008 || Kitt Peak || Spacewatch || — || align=right | 1.6 km || 
|-id=236 bgcolor=#E9E9E9
| 274236 ||  || — || June 28, 2008 || Siding Spring || SSS || — || align=right | 1.8 km || 
|-id=237 bgcolor=#fefefe
| 274237 ||  || — || June 28, 2008 || Siding Spring || SSS || — || align=right | 1.4 km || 
|-id=238 bgcolor=#E9E9E9
| 274238 ||  || — || July 3, 2008 || Pla D'Arguines || R. Ferrando || — || align=right | 4.0 km || 
|-id=239 bgcolor=#d6d6d6
| 274239 ||  || — || July 3, 2008 || Grove Creek || F. Tozzi || — || align=right | 3.7 km || 
|-id=240 bgcolor=#d6d6d6
| 274240 ||  || — || July 10, 2008 || La Sagra || OAM Obs. || — || align=right | 3.0 km || 
|-id=241 bgcolor=#E9E9E9
| 274241 ||  || — || July 5, 2008 || Siding Spring || SSS || — || align=right | 2.9 km || 
|-id=242 bgcolor=#fefefe
| 274242 || 2008 OW || — || July 26, 2008 || La Sagra || OAM Obs. || — || align=right data-sort-value="0.76" | 760 m || 
|-id=243 bgcolor=#E9E9E9
| 274243 ||  || — || September 14, 2004 || Anderson Mesa || LONEOS || — || align=right | 2.3 km || 
|-id=244 bgcolor=#fefefe
| 274244 ||  || — || July 27, 2008 || Bisei SG Center || BATTeRS || — || align=right data-sort-value="0.84" | 840 m || 
|-id=245 bgcolor=#E9E9E9
| 274245 ||  || — || July 26, 2008 || Siding Spring || SSS || — || align=right | 3.5 km || 
|-id=246 bgcolor=#E9E9E9
| 274246 Reggiacaserta ||  ||  || July 31, 2008 || Vallemare di Borbona || V. S. Casulli || — || align=right | 1.5 km || 
|-id=247 bgcolor=#fefefe
| 274247 ||  || — || July 31, 2008 || La Sagra || OAM Obs. || — || align=right | 1.2 km || 
|-id=248 bgcolor=#fefefe
| 274248 ||  || — || July 29, 2008 || Socorro || LINEAR || — || align=right | 2.3 km || 
|-id=249 bgcolor=#d6d6d6
| 274249 ||  || — || July 29, 2008 || La Sagra || OAM Obs. || HYG || align=right | 2.8 km || 
|-id=250 bgcolor=#d6d6d6
| 274250 ||  || — || July 29, 2008 || Kitt Peak || Spacewatch || KOR || align=right | 1.6 km || 
|-id=251 bgcolor=#d6d6d6
| 274251 ||  || — || July 29, 2008 || Kitt Peak || Spacewatch || — || align=right | 2.7 km || 
|-id=252 bgcolor=#fefefe
| 274252 ||  || — || July 29, 2008 || Kitt Peak || Spacewatch || — || align=right data-sort-value="0.87" | 870 m || 
|-id=253 bgcolor=#d6d6d6
| 274253 ||  || — || July 30, 2008 || Kitt Peak || Spacewatch || HYG || align=right | 3.1 km || 
|-id=254 bgcolor=#E9E9E9
| 274254 ||  || — || July 29, 2008 || Kitt Peak || Spacewatch || — || align=right | 2.0 km || 
|-id=255 bgcolor=#d6d6d6
| 274255 ||  || — || July 29, 2008 || Kitt Peak || Spacewatch || KOR || align=right | 1.5 km || 
|-id=256 bgcolor=#fefefe
| 274256 ||  || — || July 29, 2008 || Kitt Peak || Spacewatch || NYS || align=right data-sort-value="0.69" | 690 m || 
|-id=257 bgcolor=#d6d6d6
| 274257 ||  || — || July 29, 2008 || Kitt Peak || Spacewatch || — || align=right | 2.4 km || 
|-id=258 bgcolor=#fefefe
| 274258 ||  || — || July 30, 2008 || Kitt Peak || Spacewatch || — || align=right data-sort-value="0.96" | 960 m || 
|-id=259 bgcolor=#E9E9E9
| 274259 ||  || — || July 31, 2008 || Kitt Peak || Spacewatch || — || align=right | 2.4 km || 
|-id=260 bgcolor=#d6d6d6
| 274260 ||  || — || July 29, 2008 || Kitt Peak || Spacewatch || — || align=right | 5.5 km || 
|-id=261 bgcolor=#fefefe
| 274261 || 2008 PS || — || August 1, 2008 || Dauban || F. Kugel || NYS || align=right data-sort-value="0.73" | 730 m || 
|-id=262 bgcolor=#fefefe
| 274262 || 2008 PT || — || August 1, 2008 || Dauban || F. Kugel || — || align=right data-sort-value="0.98" | 980 m || 
|-id=263 bgcolor=#d6d6d6
| 274263 ||  || — || August 5, 2008 || La Sagra || OAM Obs. || — || align=right | 4.3 km || 
|-id=264 bgcolor=#E9E9E9
| 274264 Piccolomini ||  ||  || August 5, 2008 || Vallemare di Borbona || V. S. Casulli || — || align=right | 2.1 km || 
|-id=265 bgcolor=#d6d6d6
| 274265 ||  || — || August 5, 2008 || La Sagra || OAM Obs. || — || align=right | 3.6 km || 
|-id=266 bgcolor=#fefefe
| 274266 ||  || — || August 5, 2008 || La Sagra || OAM Obs. || — || align=right data-sort-value="0.83" | 830 m || 
|-id=267 bgcolor=#E9E9E9
| 274267 ||  || — || August 6, 2008 || La Sagra || OAM Obs. || — || align=right | 2.5 km || 
|-id=268 bgcolor=#fefefe
| 274268 ||  || — || August 8, 2008 || Dauban || F. Kugel || — || align=right | 1.3 km || 
|-id=269 bgcolor=#fefefe
| 274269 ||  || — || August 8, 2008 || Reedy Creek || J. Broughton || — || align=right | 1.1 km || 
|-id=270 bgcolor=#fefefe
| 274270 ||  || — || August 9, 2008 || Reedy Creek || J. Broughton || — || align=right | 1.5 km || 
|-id=271 bgcolor=#fefefe
| 274271 ||  || — || August 10, 2008 || Pla D'Arguines || R. Ferrando || — || align=right data-sort-value="0.72" | 720 m || 
|-id=272 bgcolor=#C2FFFF
| 274272 ||  || — || August 10, 2008 || Pla D'Arguines || R. Ferrando || L4 || align=right | 8.8 km || 
|-id=273 bgcolor=#E9E9E9
| 274273 ||  || — || August 9, 2008 || La Sagra || OAM Obs. || — || align=right | 1.3 km || 
|-id=274 bgcolor=#fefefe
| 274274 ||  || — || August 10, 2008 || La Sagra || OAM Obs. || — || align=right | 1.1 km || 
|-id=275 bgcolor=#fefefe
| 274275 ||  || — || August 10, 2008 || La Sagra || OAM Obs. || — || align=right data-sort-value="0.87" | 870 m || 
|-id=276 bgcolor=#fefefe
| 274276 ||  || — || August 8, 2008 || Reedy Creek || J. Broughton || — || align=right data-sort-value="0.82" | 820 m || 
|-id=277 bgcolor=#d6d6d6
| 274277 ||  || — || August 5, 2008 || Siding Spring || SSS || — || align=right | 4.5 km || 
|-id=278 bgcolor=#fefefe
| 274278 ||  || — || August 6, 2008 || Siding Spring || SSS || — || align=right | 1.3 km || 
|-id=279 bgcolor=#fefefe
| 274279 ||  || — || August 6, 2008 || Siding Spring || SSS || — || align=right | 1.6 km || 
|-id=280 bgcolor=#E9E9E9
| 274280 ||  || — || August 6, 2008 || Siding Spring || SSS || — || align=right | 3.6 km || 
|-id=281 bgcolor=#fefefe
| 274281 ||  || — || August 24, 2008 || La Sagra || OAM Obs. || NYS || align=right | 1.1 km || 
|-id=282 bgcolor=#E9E9E9
| 274282 ||  || — || August 24, 2008 || Marly || P. Kocher || — || align=right | 2.4 km || 
|-id=283 bgcolor=#fefefe
| 274283 ||  || — || August 24, 2008 || Dauban || F. Kugel || NYS || align=right | 1.1 km || 
|-id=284 bgcolor=#fefefe
| 274284 ||  || — || August 25, 2008 || Dauban || F. Kugel || — || align=right | 2.8 km || 
|-id=285 bgcolor=#E9E9E9
| 274285 ||  || — || August 25, 2008 || La Sagra || OAM Obs. || — || align=right | 2.6 km || 
|-id=286 bgcolor=#E9E9E9
| 274286 ||  || — || August 25, 2008 || La Sagra || OAM Obs. || HOF || align=right | 3.0 km || 
|-id=287 bgcolor=#fefefe
| 274287 ||  || — || August 25, 2008 || La Sagra || OAM Obs. || — || align=right | 1.2 km || 
|-id=288 bgcolor=#d6d6d6
| 274288 ||  || — || August 26, 2008 || La Sagra || OAM Obs. || — || align=right | 3.9 km || 
|-id=289 bgcolor=#d6d6d6
| 274289 ||  || — || August 26, 2008 || La Sagra || OAM Obs. || THM || align=right | 2.5 km || 
|-id=290 bgcolor=#d6d6d6
| 274290 ||  || — || August 27, 2008 || Piszkéstető || K. Sárneczky || — || align=right | 3.3 km || 
|-id=291 bgcolor=#E9E9E9
| 274291 ||  || — || August 21, 2008 || Kitt Peak || Spacewatch || — || align=right | 1.8 km || 
|-id=292 bgcolor=#E9E9E9
| 274292 ||  || — || August 26, 2008 || La Sagra || OAM Obs. || ADE || align=right | 3.2 km || 
|-id=293 bgcolor=#d6d6d6
| 274293 ||  || — || August 26, 2008 || La Sagra || OAM Obs. || — || align=right | 3.6 km || 
|-id=294 bgcolor=#E9E9E9
| 274294 ||  || — || February 26, 2007 || Mount Lemmon || Mount Lemmon Survey || — || align=right | 2.1 km || 
|-id=295 bgcolor=#d6d6d6
| 274295 ||  || — || August 28, 2008 || Pla D'Arguines || R. Ferrando || THM || align=right | 2.5 km || 
|-id=296 bgcolor=#d6d6d6
| 274296 ||  || — || August 27, 2008 || Kleť || Kleť Obs. || — || align=right | 5.3 km || 
|-id=297 bgcolor=#d6d6d6
| 274297 ||  || — || August 29, 2008 || Hibiscus || S. F. Hönig, N. Teamo || — || align=right | 4.0 km || 
|-id=298 bgcolor=#d6d6d6
| 274298 ||  || — || August 26, 2008 || Socorro || LINEAR || — || align=right | 4.5 km || 
|-id=299 bgcolor=#d6d6d6
| 274299 ||  || — || August 26, 2008 || Socorro || LINEAR || — || align=right | 4.6 km || 
|-id=300 bgcolor=#fefefe
| 274300 UNESCO ||  ||  || August 25, 2008 || Andrushivka || Andrushivka Obs. || — || align=right | 1.2 km || 
|}

274301–274400 

|-bgcolor=#fefefe
| 274301 Wikipedia ||  ||  || August 25, 2008 || Andrushivka || Andrushivka Obs. || V || align=right data-sort-value="0.89" | 890 m || 
|-id=302 bgcolor=#d6d6d6
| 274302 Abaházi ||  ||  || August 24, 2008 || Piszkéstető || K. Sárneczky || — || align=right | 4.5 km || 
|-id=303 bgcolor=#E9E9E9
| 274303 ||  || — || August 24, 2008 || La Sagra || OAM Obs. || HEN || align=right | 1.8 km || 
|-id=304 bgcolor=#E9E9E9
| 274304 ||  || — || August 27, 2008 || La Sagra || OAM Obs. || — || align=right | 2.5 km || 
|-id=305 bgcolor=#d6d6d6
| 274305 ||  || — || August 29, 2008 || La Sagra || OAM Obs. || — || align=right | 3.5 km || 
|-id=306 bgcolor=#fefefe
| 274306 ||  || — || August 22, 2008 || Kitt Peak || Spacewatch || — || align=right | 1.1 km || 
|-id=307 bgcolor=#E9E9E9
| 274307 ||  || — || August 21, 2008 || Kitt Peak || Spacewatch || AGN || align=right | 1.5 km || 
|-id=308 bgcolor=#d6d6d6
| 274308 ||  || — || August 21, 2008 || Kitt Peak || Spacewatch || KOR || align=right | 2.0 km || 
|-id=309 bgcolor=#E9E9E9
| 274309 ||  || — || August 24, 2008 || Kitt Peak || Spacewatch || — || align=right | 1.1 km || 
|-id=310 bgcolor=#d6d6d6
| 274310 ||  || — || August 24, 2008 || Kitt Peak || Spacewatch || — || align=right | 3.9 km || 
|-id=311 bgcolor=#E9E9E9
| 274311 ||  || — || August 25, 2008 || La Sagra || OAM Obs. || — || align=right | 2.7 km || 
|-id=312 bgcolor=#d6d6d6
| 274312 ||  || — || August 21, 2008 || Kitt Peak || Spacewatch || KOR || align=right | 1.6 km || 
|-id=313 bgcolor=#d6d6d6
| 274313 ||  || — || August 23, 2008 || Kitt Peak || Spacewatch || HYG || align=right | 3.2 km || 
|-id=314 bgcolor=#d6d6d6
| 274314 ||  || — || August 24, 2008 || Kitt Peak || Spacewatch || — || align=right | 3.0 km || 
|-id=315 bgcolor=#E9E9E9
| 274315 ||  || — || August 26, 2008 || Socorro || LINEAR || GEF || align=right | 1.9 km || 
|-id=316 bgcolor=#d6d6d6
| 274316 ||  || — || August 24, 2008 || Socorro || LINEAR || — || align=right | 3.1 km || 
|-id=317 bgcolor=#d6d6d6
| 274317 ||  || — || August 30, 2008 || Socorro || LINEAR || EOS || align=right | 2.5 km || 
|-id=318 bgcolor=#E9E9E9
| 274318 ||  || — || September 1, 2008 || Hibiscus || S. F. Hönig, N. Teamo || WIT || align=right | 1.6 km || 
|-id=319 bgcolor=#E9E9E9
| 274319 ||  || — || September 2, 2008 || Kitt Peak || Spacewatch || — || align=right | 2.1 km || 
|-id=320 bgcolor=#E9E9E9
| 274320 ||  || — || September 2, 2008 || Kitt Peak || Spacewatch || HEN || align=right | 1.1 km || 
|-id=321 bgcolor=#d6d6d6
| 274321 ||  || — || September 2, 2008 || Kitt Peak || Spacewatch || — || align=right | 3.8 km || 
|-id=322 bgcolor=#E9E9E9
| 274322 ||  || — || September 2, 2008 || Kitt Peak || Spacewatch || — || align=right | 1.2 km || 
|-id=323 bgcolor=#fefefe
| 274323 ||  || — || September 2, 2008 || Kitt Peak || Spacewatch || MAS || align=right | 1.1 km || 
|-id=324 bgcolor=#d6d6d6
| 274324 ||  || — || September 3, 2008 || Kitt Peak || Spacewatch || — || align=right | 3.7 km || 
|-id=325 bgcolor=#d6d6d6
| 274325 ||  || — || September 3, 2008 || Kitt Peak || Spacewatch || — || align=right | 2.8 km || 
|-id=326 bgcolor=#d6d6d6
| 274326 ||  || — || September 3, 2008 || Kitt Peak || Spacewatch || — || align=right | 2.7 km || 
|-id=327 bgcolor=#E9E9E9
| 274327 ||  || — || September 3, 2008 || Kitt Peak || Spacewatch || ADE || align=right | 3.1 km || 
|-id=328 bgcolor=#d6d6d6
| 274328 ||  || — || September 3, 2008 || Kitt Peak || Spacewatch || KOR || align=right | 1.6 km || 
|-id=329 bgcolor=#E9E9E9
| 274329 ||  || — || September 4, 2008 || Kitt Peak || Spacewatch || — || align=right | 3.5 km || 
|-id=330 bgcolor=#E9E9E9
| 274330 ||  || — || September 4, 2008 || Kitt Peak || Spacewatch || — || align=right | 1.3 km || 
|-id=331 bgcolor=#d6d6d6
| 274331 ||  || — || September 4, 2008 || Kitt Peak || Spacewatch || — || align=right | 3.1 km || 
|-id=332 bgcolor=#d6d6d6
| 274332 ||  || — || September 4, 2008 || Kitt Peak || Spacewatch || — || align=right | 4.5 km || 
|-id=333 bgcolor=#E9E9E9
| 274333 Voznyukigor ||  ||  || September 2, 2008 || Andrushivka || Andrushivka Obs. || — || align=right | 2.4 km || 
|-id=334 bgcolor=#E9E9E9
| 274334 Kyivplaniy ||  ||  || September 3, 2008 || Andrushivka || Andrushivka Obs. || — || align=right | 2.2 km || 
|-id=335 bgcolor=#d6d6d6
| 274335 ||  || — || September 5, 2008 || Wrightwood || J. W. Young || — || align=right | 4.3 km || 
|-id=336 bgcolor=#E9E9E9
| 274336 ||  || — || September 4, 2008 || Socorro || LINEAR || — || align=right | 1.5 km || 
|-id=337 bgcolor=#E9E9E9
| 274337 ||  || — || September 5, 2008 || Goodricke-Pigott || R. A. Tucker || — || align=right | 4.5 km || 
|-id=338 bgcolor=#d6d6d6
| 274338 ||  || — || September 2, 2008 || Kitt Peak || Spacewatch || 7:4 || align=right | 6.0 km || 
|-id=339 bgcolor=#E9E9E9
| 274339 ||  || — || September 2, 2008 || Kitt Peak || Spacewatch || HEN || align=right | 1.1 km || 
|-id=340 bgcolor=#E9E9E9
| 274340 ||  || — || September 2, 2008 || Kitt Peak || Spacewatch || XIZ || align=right | 1.6 km || 
|-id=341 bgcolor=#d6d6d6
| 274341 ||  || — || September 2, 2008 || Kitt Peak || Spacewatch || HYG || align=right | 3.8 km || 
|-id=342 bgcolor=#E9E9E9
| 274342 ||  || — || September 2, 2008 || Kitt Peak || Spacewatch || — || align=right | 1.1 km || 
|-id=343 bgcolor=#d6d6d6
| 274343 ||  || — || September 2, 2008 || Kitt Peak || Spacewatch || EOS || align=right | 2.1 km || 
|-id=344 bgcolor=#d6d6d6
| 274344 ||  || — || September 2, 2008 || Kitt Peak || Spacewatch || 3:2 || align=right | 5.8 km || 
|-id=345 bgcolor=#E9E9E9
| 274345 ||  || — || September 2, 2008 || Kitt Peak || Spacewatch || KON || align=right | 3.1 km || 
|-id=346 bgcolor=#d6d6d6
| 274346 ||  || — || September 2, 2008 || Kitt Peak || Spacewatch || EOS || align=right | 2.2 km || 
|-id=347 bgcolor=#d6d6d6
| 274347 ||  || — || September 2, 2008 || Kitt Peak || Spacewatch || — || align=right | 2.9 km || 
|-id=348 bgcolor=#d6d6d6
| 274348 ||  || — || September 2, 2008 || Kitt Peak || Spacewatch || — || align=right | 3.2 km || 
|-id=349 bgcolor=#d6d6d6
| 274349 ||  || — || September 2, 2008 || Kitt Peak || Spacewatch || — || align=right | 3.1 km || 
|-id=350 bgcolor=#d6d6d6
| 274350 ||  || — || September 2, 2008 || Kitt Peak || Spacewatch || KAR || align=right | 1.2 km || 
|-id=351 bgcolor=#E9E9E9
| 274351 ||  || — || September 2, 2008 || Kitt Peak || Spacewatch || MIS || align=right | 2.1 km || 
|-id=352 bgcolor=#E9E9E9
| 274352 ||  || — || September 2, 2008 || Kitt Peak || Spacewatch || NEM || align=right | 3.0 km || 
|-id=353 bgcolor=#E9E9E9
| 274353 ||  || — || September 2, 2008 || Kitt Peak || Spacewatch || MRX || align=right | 1.2 km || 
|-id=354 bgcolor=#fefefe
| 274354 ||  || — || September 2, 2008 || La Sagra || OAM Obs. || — || align=right data-sort-value="0.89" | 890 m || 
|-id=355 bgcolor=#E9E9E9
| 274355 ||  || — || September 4, 2008 || Kitt Peak || Spacewatch || — || align=right | 2.5 km || 
|-id=356 bgcolor=#E9E9E9
| 274356 ||  || — || September 4, 2008 || Kitt Peak || Spacewatch || — || align=right | 3.1 km || 
|-id=357 bgcolor=#fefefe
| 274357 ||  || — || September 4, 2008 || Kitt Peak || Spacewatch || MAS || align=right | 1.0 km || 
|-id=358 bgcolor=#d6d6d6
| 274358 ||  || — || September 4, 2008 || Kitt Peak || Spacewatch || KOR || align=right | 2.3 km || 
|-id=359 bgcolor=#E9E9E9
| 274359 ||  || — || September 4, 2008 || Kitt Peak || Spacewatch || — || align=right | 2.4 km || 
|-id=360 bgcolor=#E9E9E9
| 274360 ||  || — || September 4, 2008 || Kitt Peak || Spacewatch || ADE || align=right | 2.7 km || 
|-id=361 bgcolor=#d6d6d6
| 274361 ||  || — || September 4, 2008 || Kitt Peak || Spacewatch || TEL || align=right | 1.4 km || 
|-id=362 bgcolor=#d6d6d6
| 274362 ||  || — || September 4, 2008 || Kitt Peak || Spacewatch || — || align=right | 3.1 km || 
|-id=363 bgcolor=#E9E9E9
| 274363 ||  || — || September 5, 2008 || Kitt Peak || Spacewatch || — || align=right | 1.9 km || 
|-id=364 bgcolor=#E9E9E9
| 274364 ||  || — || September 6, 2008 || Mount Lemmon || Mount Lemmon Survey || — || align=right | 2.6 km || 
|-id=365 bgcolor=#E9E9E9
| 274365 ||  || — || September 6, 2008 || Mount Lemmon || Mount Lemmon Survey || MAR || align=right | 1.3 km || 
|-id=366 bgcolor=#E9E9E9
| 274366 ||  || — || September 6, 2008 || Mount Lemmon || Mount Lemmon Survey || — || align=right | 1.4 km || 
|-id=367 bgcolor=#E9E9E9
| 274367 ||  || — || September 6, 2008 || Mount Lemmon || Mount Lemmon Survey || AGN || align=right | 1.4 km || 
|-id=368 bgcolor=#d6d6d6
| 274368 ||  || — || September 6, 2008 || Catalina || CSS || HYG || align=right | 3.2 km || 
|-id=369 bgcolor=#E9E9E9
| 274369 ||  || — || September 6, 2008 || Catalina || CSS || PAL || align=right | 4.2 km || 
|-id=370 bgcolor=#d6d6d6
| 274370 ||  || — || December 16, 1999 || Kitt Peak || Spacewatch || KOR || align=right | 1.6 km || 
|-id=371 bgcolor=#d6d6d6
| 274371 ||  || — || September 6, 2008 || Catalina || CSS || — || align=right | 4.5 km || 
|-id=372 bgcolor=#E9E9E9
| 274372 ||  || — || September 6, 2008 || Catalina || CSS || — || align=right | 2.7 km || 
|-id=373 bgcolor=#d6d6d6
| 274373 ||  || — || September 7, 2008 || Mount Lemmon || Mount Lemmon Survey || KOR || align=right | 2.4 km || 
|-id=374 bgcolor=#E9E9E9
| 274374 ||  || — || September 5, 2008 || Kitt Peak || Spacewatch || NEM || align=right | 3.0 km || 
|-id=375 bgcolor=#d6d6d6
| 274375 ||  || — || September 3, 2008 || Kitt Peak || Spacewatch || — || align=right | 4.2 km || 
|-id=376 bgcolor=#E9E9E9
| 274376 ||  || — || September 5, 2008 || Kitt Peak || Spacewatch || — || align=right | 2.4 km || 
|-id=377 bgcolor=#d6d6d6
| 274377 ||  || — || September 5, 2008 || Kitt Peak || Spacewatch || URS || align=right | 5.5 km || 
|-id=378 bgcolor=#fefefe
| 274378 ||  || — || September 7, 2008 || Catalina || CSS || V || align=right data-sort-value="0.83" | 830 m || 
|-id=379 bgcolor=#E9E9E9
| 274379 ||  || — || September 7, 2008 || Catalina || CSS || — || align=right | 1.9 km || 
|-id=380 bgcolor=#d6d6d6
| 274380 ||  || — || September 2, 2008 || Kitt Peak || Spacewatch || — || align=right | 2.7 km || 
|-id=381 bgcolor=#E9E9E9
| 274381 ||  || — || September 2, 2008 || Kitt Peak || Spacewatch || DOR || align=right | 3.0 km || 
|-id=382 bgcolor=#d6d6d6
| 274382 ||  || — || September 2, 2008 || Kitt Peak || Spacewatch || 628 || align=right | 2.4 km || 
|-id=383 bgcolor=#E9E9E9
| 274383 ||  || — || September 5, 2008 || Kitt Peak || Spacewatch || — || align=right | 3.0 km || 
|-id=384 bgcolor=#d6d6d6
| 274384 ||  || — || September 6, 2008 || Catalina || CSS || — || align=right | 5.7 km || 
|-id=385 bgcolor=#d6d6d6
| 274385 ||  || — || September 6, 2008 || Catalina || CSS || — || align=right | 4.0 km || 
|-id=386 bgcolor=#E9E9E9
| 274386 ||  || — || September 7, 2008 || Catalina || CSS || — || align=right | 3.2 km || 
|-id=387 bgcolor=#d6d6d6
| 274387 ||  || — || September 7, 2008 || Mount Lemmon || Mount Lemmon Survey || EOS || align=right | 2.1 km || 
|-id=388 bgcolor=#E9E9E9
| 274388 ||  || — || September 7, 2008 || Mount Lemmon || Mount Lemmon Survey || — || align=right | 1.9 km || 
|-id=389 bgcolor=#d6d6d6
| 274389 ||  || — || September 9, 2008 || Bergisch Gladbac || W. Bickel || — || align=right | 2.9 km || 
|-id=390 bgcolor=#E9E9E9
| 274390 ||  || — || September 2, 2008 || Kitt Peak || Spacewatch || — || align=right | 1.1 km || 
|-id=391 bgcolor=#fefefe
| 274391 ||  || — || September 2, 2008 || Kitt Peak || Spacewatch || — || align=right | 1.1 km || 
|-id=392 bgcolor=#E9E9E9
| 274392 ||  || — || September 3, 2008 || Kitt Peak || Spacewatch || EUN || align=right | 1.5 km || 
|-id=393 bgcolor=#d6d6d6
| 274393 ||  || — || September 5, 2008 || Kitt Peak || Spacewatch || EOS || align=right | 2.9 km || 
|-id=394 bgcolor=#d6d6d6
| 274394 ||  || — || September 5, 2008 || Kitt Peak || Spacewatch || EOS || align=right | 2.2 km || 
|-id=395 bgcolor=#E9E9E9
| 274395 ||  || — || September 6, 2008 || Kitt Peak || Spacewatch || — || align=right | 1.4 km || 
|-id=396 bgcolor=#E9E9E9
| 274396 ||  || — || September 6, 2008 || Mount Lemmon || Mount Lemmon Survey || — || align=right | 2.3 km || 
|-id=397 bgcolor=#E9E9E9
| 274397 ||  || — || September 6, 2008 || Mount Lemmon || Mount Lemmon Survey || NEM || align=right | 2.7 km || 
|-id=398 bgcolor=#d6d6d6
| 274398 ||  || — || September 3, 2008 || Kitt Peak || Spacewatch || — || align=right | 2.7 km || 
|-id=399 bgcolor=#E9E9E9
| 274399 ||  || — || September 4, 2008 || Kitt Peak || Spacewatch || — || align=right | 1.0 km || 
|-id=400 bgcolor=#d6d6d6
| 274400 ||  || — || September 6, 2008 || Kitt Peak || Spacewatch || — || align=right | 3.1 km || 
|}

274401–274500 

|-bgcolor=#C2FFFF
| 274401 ||  || — || September 6, 2008 || Kitt Peak || Spacewatch || L4 || align=right | 13 km || 
|-id=402 bgcolor=#E9E9E9
| 274402 ||  || — || September 9, 2008 || Mount Lemmon || Mount Lemmon Survey || NEM || align=right | 2.5 km || 
|-id=403 bgcolor=#d6d6d6
| 274403 ||  || — || September 7, 2008 || Mount Lemmon || Mount Lemmon Survey || — || align=right | 4.4 km || 
|-id=404 bgcolor=#C2FFFF
| 274404 ||  || — || September 4, 2008 || Kitt Peak || Spacewatch || L4 || align=right | 9.0 km || 
|-id=405 bgcolor=#d6d6d6
| 274405 ||  || — || September 4, 2008 || Kitt Peak || Spacewatch || KOR || align=right | 1.7 km || 
|-id=406 bgcolor=#E9E9E9
| 274406 ||  || — || September 6, 2008 || Catalina || CSS || PAD || align=right | 3.1 km || 
|-id=407 bgcolor=#d6d6d6
| 274407 ||  || — || September 7, 2008 || Catalina || CSS || — || align=right | 2.9 km || 
|-id=408 bgcolor=#E9E9E9
| 274408 ||  || — || September 6, 2008 || Catalina || CSS || HOF || align=right | 4.6 km || 
|-id=409 bgcolor=#d6d6d6
| 274409 ||  || — || September 9, 2008 || Mount Lemmon || Mount Lemmon Survey || URS || align=right | 5.7 km || 
|-id=410 bgcolor=#E9E9E9
| 274410 ||  || — || September 6, 2008 || Catalina || CSS || — || align=right | 1.8 km || 
|-id=411 bgcolor=#d6d6d6
| 274411 ||  || — || September 2, 2008 || Kitt Peak || Spacewatch || — || align=right | 4.5 km || 
|-id=412 bgcolor=#d6d6d6
| 274412 ||  || — || September 2, 2008 || Kitt Peak || Spacewatch || — || align=right | 2.6 km || 
|-id=413 bgcolor=#E9E9E9
| 274413 ||  || — || September 22, 2008 || Socorro || LINEAR || — || align=right | 3.7 km || 
|-id=414 bgcolor=#d6d6d6
| 274414 ||  || — || September 22, 2008 || Socorro || LINEAR || HYG || align=right | 5.1 km || 
|-id=415 bgcolor=#E9E9E9
| 274415 ||  || — || September 22, 2008 || Socorro || LINEAR || — || align=right | 2.7 km || 
|-id=416 bgcolor=#E9E9E9
| 274416 ||  || — || September 22, 2008 || Skylive Obs. || F. Tozzi || — || align=right | 3.5 km || 
|-id=417 bgcolor=#d6d6d6
| 274417 ||  || — || September 22, 2008 || Socorro || LINEAR || KOR || align=right | 1.8 km || 
|-id=418 bgcolor=#d6d6d6
| 274418 ||  || — || September 22, 2008 || Socorro || LINEAR || THM || align=right | 2.7 km || 
|-id=419 bgcolor=#d6d6d6
| 274419 ||  || — || September 20, 2008 || Mount Lemmon || Mount Lemmon Survey || — || align=right | 3.0 km || 
|-id=420 bgcolor=#E9E9E9
| 274420 ||  || — || September 19, 2008 || Kitt Peak || Spacewatch || — || align=right | 2.7 km || 
|-id=421 bgcolor=#d6d6d6
| 274421 ||  || — || September 19, 2008 || Kitt Peak || Spacewatch || — || align=right | 3.5 km || 
|-id=422 bgcolor=#FA8072
| 274422 ||  || — || September 19, 2008 || Kitt Peak || Spacewatch || — || align=right data-sort-value="0.81" | 810 m || 
|-id=423 bgcolor=#E9E9E9
| 274423 ||  || — || September 19, 2008 || Kitt Peak || Spacewatch || WIT || align=right | 1.2 km || 
|-id=424 bgcolor=#E9E9E9
| 274424 ||  || — || September 19, 2008 || Kitt Peak || Spacewatch || HEN || align=right data-sort-value="0.98" | 980 m || 
|-id=425 bgcolor=#d6d6d6
| 274425 ||  || — || September 19, 2008 || Kitt Peak || Spacewatch || HYG || align=right | 2.6 km || 
|-id=426 bgcolor=#fefefe
| 274426 ||  || — || September 19, 2008 || Kitt Peak || Spacewatch || ERI || align=right | 1.6 km || 
|-id=427 bgcolor=#d6d6d6
| 274427 ||  || — || September 19, 2008 || Kitt Peak || Spacewatch || HYG || align=right | 4.0 km || 
|-id=428 bgcolor=#E9E9E9
| 274428 ||  || — || September 19, 2008 || Kitt Peak || Spacewatch || — || align=right | 1.9 km || 
|-id=429 bgcolor=#E9E9E9
| 274429 ||  || — || September 19, 2008 || Kitt Peak || Spacewatch || WIT || align=right | 1.2 km || 
|-id=430 bgcolor=#fefefe
| 274430 ||  || — || September 20, 2008 || Catalina || CSS || FLO || align=right data-sort-value="0.71" | 710 m || 
|-id=431 bgcolor=#d6d6d6
| 274431 ||  || — || September 20, 2008 || Kitt Peak || Spacewatch || — || align=right | 3.3 km || 
|-id=432 bgcolor=#d6d6d6
| 274432 ||  || — || September 20, 2008 || Kitt Peak || Spacewatch || — || align=right | 2.7 km || 
|-id=433 bgcolor=#fefefe
| 274433 ||  || — || September 20, 2008 || Kitt Peak || Spacewatch || — || align=right data-sort-value="0.87" | 870 m || 
|-id=434 bgcolor=#d6d6d6
| 274434 ||  || — || September 20, 2008 || Mount Lemmon || Mount Lemmon Survey || — || align=right | 3.5 km || 
|-id=435 bgcolor=#E9E9E9
| 274435 ||  || — || September 20, 2008 || Kitt Peak || Spacewatch || — || align=right | 1.1 km || 
|-id=436 bgcolor=#d6d6d6
| 274436 ||  || — || September 20, 2008 || Kitt Peak || Spacewatch || TEL || align=right | 1.9 km || 
|-id=437 bgcolor=#d6d6d6
| 274437 ||  || — || September 20, 2008 || Kitt Peak || Spacewatch || EOS || align=right | 3.2 km || 
|-id=438 bgcolor=#d6d6d6
| 274438 ||  || — || September 20, 2008 || Catalina || CSS || — || align=right | 5.2 km || 
|-id=439 bgcolor=#d6d6d6
| 274439 ||  || — || September 20, 2008 || Kitt Peak || Spacewatch || EOS || align=right | 2.4 km || 
|-id=440 bgcolor=#d6d6d6
| 274440 ||  || — || September 20, 2008 || Mount Lemmon || Mount Lemmon Survey || — || align=right | 5.0 km || 
|-id=441 bgcolor=#d6d6d6
| 274441 ||  || — || September 20, 2008 || Kitt Peak || Spacewatch || — || align=right | 5.0 km || 
|-id=442 bgcolor=#d6d6d6
| 274442 ||  || — || September 20, 2008 || Kitt Peak || Spacewatch || — || align=right | 5.0 km || 
|-id=443 bgcolor=#E9E9E9
| 274443 ||  || — || September 20, 2008 || Kitt Peak || Spacewatch || — || align=right | 1.6 km || 
|-id=444 bgcolor=#E9E9E9
| 274444 ||  || — || September 20, 2008 || Catalina || CSS || HOF || align=right | 3.8 km || 
|-id=445 bgcolor=#E9E9E9
| 274445 ||  || — || September 20, 2008 || Mount Lemmon || Mount Lemmon Survey || — || align=right | 3.5 km || 
|-id=446 bgcolor=#d6d6d6
| 274446 ||  || — || September 20, 2008 || Mount Lemmon || Mount Lemmon Survey || EOS || align=right | 2.6 km || 
|-id=447 bgcolor=#d6d6d6
| 274447 ||  || — || September 20, 2008 || Mount Lemmon || Mount Lemmon Survey || — || align=right | 5.1 km || 
|-id=448 bgcolor=#E9E9E9
| 274448 ||  || — || September 20, 2008 || Mount Lemmon || Mount Lemmon Survey || — || align=right | 1.8 km || 
|-id=449 bgcolor=#d6d6d6
| 274449 ||  || — || September 20, 2008 || Mount Lemmon || Mount Lemmon Survey || KOR || align=right | 1.7 km || 
|-id=450 bgcolor=#d6d6d6
| 274450 ||  || — || September 20, 2008 || Mount Lemmon || Mount Lemmon Survey || — || align=right | 3.0 km || 
|-id=451 bgcolor=#E9E9E9
| 274451 ||  || — || September 20, 2008 || Mount Lemmon || Mount Lemmon Survey || — || align=right | 2.4 km || 
|-id=452 bgcolor=#d6d6d6
| 274452 ||  || — || September 20, 2008 || Mount Lemmon || Mount Lemmon Survey || — || align=right | 4.8 km || 
|-id=453 bgcolor=#d6d6d6
| 274453 ||  || — || September 20, 2008 || Kitt Peak || Spacewatch || — || align=right | 4.2 km || 
|-id=454 bgcolor=#d6d6d6
| 274454 ||  || — || September 20, 2008 || Kitt Peak || Spacewatch || HYG || align=right | 3.9 km || 
|-id=455 bgcolor=#fefefe
| 274455 ||  || — || September 20, 2008 || Kitt Peak || Spacewatch || CHL || align=right | 3.0 km || 
|-id=456 bgcolor=#fefefe
| 274456 ||  || — || September 20, 2008 || Catalina || CSS || NYS || align=right data-sort-value="0.86" | 860 m || 
|-id=457 bgcolor=#E9E9E9
| 274457 ||  || — || September 21, 2008 || Kitt Peak || Spacewatch || — || align=right | 2.1 km || 
|-id=458 bgcolor=#d6d6d6
| 274458 ||  || — || September 21, 2008 || Kitt Peak || Spacewatch || HYG || align=right | 3.0 km || 
|-id=459 bgcolor=#E9E9E9
| 274459 ||  || — || September 21, 2008 || Mount Lemmon || Mount Lemmon Survey || — || align=right | 1.00 km || 
|-id=460 bgcolor=#d6d6d6
| 274460 ||  || — || September 21, 2008 || Mount Lemmon || Mount Lemmon Survey || — || align=right | 3.8 km || 
|-id=461 bgcolor=#d6d6d6
| 274461 ||  || — || September 21, 2008 || Mount Lemmon || Mount Lemmon Survey || EOS || align=right | 2.2 km || 
|-id=462 bgcolor=#d6d6d6
| 274462 ||  || — || September 21, 2008 || Kitt Peak || Spacewatch || — || align=right | 3.6 km || 
|-id=463 bgcolor=#d6d6d6
| 274463 ||  || — || September 21, 2008 || Catalina || CSS || EOS || align=right | 2.7 km || 
|-id=464 bgcolor=#E9E9E9
| 274464 ||  || — || September 22, 2008 || Kitt Peak || Spacewatch || HOF || align=right | 3.0 km || 
|-id=465 bgcolor=#d6d6d6
| 274465 ||  || — || September 22, 2008 || Mount Lemmon || Mount Lemmon Survey || SYL7:4 || align=right | 5.3 km || 
|-id=466 bgcolor=#E9E9E9
| 274466 ||  || — || September 22, 2008 || Kitt Peak || Spacewatch || HOF || align=right | 3.4 km || 
|-id=467 bgcolor=#d6d6d6
| 274467 ||  || — || September 23, 2008 || Mount Lemmon || Mount Lemmon Survey || CHA || align=right | 2.6 km || 
|-id=468 bgcolor=#d6d6d6
| 274468 ||  || — || September 23, 2008 || Catalina || CSS || — || align=right | 4.5 km || 
|-id=469 bgcolor=#E9E9E9
| 274469 ||  || — || September 23, 2008 || Marly || P. Kocher || — || align=right | 2.6 km || 
|-id=470 bgcolor=#E9E9E9
| 274470 ||  || — || September 22, 2008 || Hibiscus || N. Teamo || — || align=right | 3.1 km || 
|-id=471 bgcolor=#E9E9E9
| 274471 ||  || — || September 26, 2008 || Bisei SG Center || BATTeRS || — || align=right | 2.3 km || 
|-id=472 bgcolor=#E9E9E9
| 274472 Pietà ||  ||  || September 28, 2008 || Vallemare Borbon || V. S. Casulli || — || align=right | 2.6 km || 
|-id=473 bgcolor=#d6d6d6
| 274473 ||  || — || September 20, 2008 || Kitt Peak || Spacewatch || EOS || align=right | 2.4 km || 
|-id=474 bgcolor=#d6d6d6
| 274474 ||  || — || September 21, 2008 || Kitt Peak || Spacewatch || — || align=right | 4.3 km || 
|-id=475 bgcolor=#E9E9E9
| 274475 ||  || — || September 21, 2008 || Kitt Peak || Spacewatch || — || align=right | 2.2 km || 
|-id=476 bgcolor=#d6d6d6
| 274476 ||  || — || September 21, 2008 || Kitt Peak || Spacewatch || TEL || align=right | 1.8 km || 
|-id=477 bgcolor=#E9E9E9
| 274477 ||  || — || September 21, 2008 || Kitt Peak || Spacewatch || GEF || align=right | 1.9 km || 
|-id=478 bgcolor=#d6d6d6
| 274478 ||  || — || September 21, 2008 || Kitt Peak || Spacewatch || EOS || align=right | 2.4 km || 
|-id=479 bgcolor=#E9E9E9
| 274479 ||  || — || September 21, 2008 || Kitt Peak || Spacewatch || — || align=right | 2.1 km || 
|-id=480 bgcolor=#d6d6d6
| 274480 ||  || — || September 21, 2008 || Kitt Peak || Spacewatch || — || align=right | 3.2 km || 
|-id=481 bgcolor=#E9E9E9
| 274481 ||  || — || September 21, 2008 || Kitt Peak || Spacewatch || MRX || align=right | 1.2 km || 
|-id=482 bgcolor=#E9E9E9
| 274482 ||  || — || September 21, 2008 || Kitt Peak || Spacewatch || — || align=right | 2.1 km || 
|-id=483 bgcolor=#E9E9E9
| 274483 ||  || — || September 21, 2008 || Kitt Peak || Spacewatch || — || align=right | 1.7 km || 
|-id=484 bgcolor=#E9E9E9
| 274484 ||  || — || September 21, 2008 || Kitt Peak || Spacewatch || — || align=right | 2.6 km || 
|-id=485 bgcolor=#d6d6d6
| 274485 ||  || — || September 21, 2008 || Kitt Peak || Spacewatch || — || align=right | 3.0 km || 
|-id=486 bgcolor=#E9E9E9
| 274486 ||  || — || September 21, 2008 || Kitt Peak || Spacewatch || — || align=right | 1.6 km || 
|-id=487 bgcolor=#d6d6d6
| 274487 ||  || — || September 22, 2008 || Kitt Peak || Spacewatch || — || align=right | 4.8 km || 
|-id=488 bgcolor=#d6d6d6
| 274488 ||  || — || September 22, 2008 || Kitt Peak || Spacewatch || — || align=right | 3.2 km || 
|-id=489 bgcolor=#E9E9E9
| 274489 ||  || — || September 22, 2008 || Kitt Peak || Spacewatch || — || align=right | 1.8 km || 
|-id=490 bgcolor=#d6d6d6
| 274490 ||  || — || September 22, 2008 || Kitt Peak || Spacewatch || — || align=right | 4.3 km || 
|-id=491 bgcolor=#E9E9E9
| 274491 ||  || — || September 22, 2008 || Kitt Peak || Spacewatch || — || align=right | 2.6 km || 
|-id=492 bgcolor=#d6d6d6
| 274492 ||  || — || September 22, 2008 || Kitt Peak || Spacewatch || — || align=right | 3.2 km || 
|-id=493 bgcolor=#d6d6d6
| 274493 ||  || — || September 22, 2008 || Mount Lemmon || Mount Lemmon Survey || — || align=right | 3.0 km || 
|-id=494 bgcolor=#d6d6d6
| 274494 ||  || — || September 22, 2008 || Mount Lemmon || Mount Lemmon Survey || — || align=right | 3.4 km || 
|-id=495 bgcolor=#E9E9E9
| 274495 ||  || — || September 22, 2008 || Mount Lemmon || Mount Lemmon Survey || JUN || align=right | 1.6 km || 
|-id=496 bgcolor=#d6d6d6
| 274496 ||  || — || September 22, 2008 || Kitt Peak || Spacewatch || — || align=right | 2.8 km || 
|-id=497 bgcolor=#d6d6d6
| 274497 ||  || — || September 22, 2008 || Kitt Peak || Spacewatch || — || align=right | 4.8 km || 
|-id=498 bgcolor=#d6d6d6
| 274498 ||  || — || September 22, 2008 || Kitt Peak || Spacewatch || — || align=right | 3.5 km || 
|-id=499 bgcolor=#d6d6d6
| 274499 ||  || — || September 22, 2008 || Kitt Peak || Spacewatch || — || align=right | 3.4 km || 
|-id=500 bgcolor=#E9E9E9
| 274500 ||  || — || September 23, 2008 || Kitt Peak || Spacewatch || NEM || align=right | 3.5 km || 
|}

274501–274600 

|-bgcolor=#E9E9E9
| 274501 ||  || — || September 23, 2008 || Mount Lemmon || Mount Lemmon Survey || HOF || align=right | 3.7 km || 
|-id=502 bgcolor=#E9E9E9
| 274502 ||  || — || September 23, 2008 || Catalina || CSS || EUN || align=right | 2.3 km || 
|-id=503 bgcolor=#E9E9E9
| 274503 ||  || — || September 23, 2008 || Kitt Peak || Spacewatch || — || align=right | 3.5 km || 
|-id=504 bgcolor=#d6d6d6
| 274504 ||  || — || September 24, 2008 || Mount Lemmon || Mount Lemmon Survey || — || align=right | 3.6 km || 
|-id=505 bgcolor=#d6d6d6
| 274505 ||  || — || September 24, 2008 || Mount Lemmon || Mount Lemmon Survey || EOS || align=right | 2.2 km || 
|-id=506 bgcolor=#C2FFFF
| 274506 ||  || — || September 25, 2008 || Kitt Peak || Spacewatch || L4 || align=right | 7.1 km || 
|-id=507 bgcolor=#E9E9E9
| 274507 ||  || — || September 25, 2008 || Bergisch Gladbac || W. Bickel || — || align=right | 3.6 km || 
|-id=508 bgcolor=#E9E9E9
| 274508 ||  || — || September 29, 2008 || Dauban || F. Kugel || AEO || align=right | 1.7 km || 
|-id=509 bgcolor=#d6d6d6
| 274509 ||  || — || September 22, 2008 || Socorro || LINEAR || — || align=right | 2.7 km || 
|-id=510 bgcolor=#d6d6d6
| 274510 ||  || — || September 23, 2008 || Socorro || LINEAR || KOR || align=right | 1.8 km || 
|-id=511 bgcolor=#E9E9E9
| 274511 ||  || — || September 24, 2008 || Socorro || LINEAR || — || align=right | 2.6 km || 
|-id=512 bgcolor=#d6d6d6
| 274512 ||  || — || September 24, 2008 || Socorro || LINEAR || LIX || align=right | 5.1 km || 
|-id=513 bgcolor=#d6d6d6
| 274513 ||  || — || September 24, 2008 || Socorro || LINEAR || — || align=right | 3.5 km || 
|-id=514 bgcolor=#E9E9E9
| 274514 ||  || — || September 28, 2008 || Socorro || LINEAR || — || align=right | 2.1 km || 
|-id=515 bgcolor=#d6d6d6
| 274515 ||  || — || September 28, 2008 || Socorro || LINEAR || — || align=right | 4.9 km || 
|-id=516 bgcolor=#E9E9E9
| 274516 ||  || — || September 28, 2008 || Socorro || LINEAR || — || align=right | 1.1 km || 
|-id=517 bgcolor=#d6d6d6
| 274517 ||  || — || September 28, 2008 || Socorro || LINEAR || CHA || align=right | 3.0 km || 
|-id=518 bgcolor=#d6d6d6
| 274518 ||  || — || September 28, 2008 || Socorro || LINEAR || — || align=right | 3.6 km || 
|-id=519 bgcolor=#d6d6d6
| 274519 ||  || — || September 22, 2008 || Kitt Peak || Spacewatch || — || align=right | 3.6 km || 
|-id=520 bgcolor=#d6d6d6
| 274520 ||  || — || September 23, 2008 || Siding Spring || SSS || — || align=right | 3.3 km || 
|-id=521 bgcolor=#d6d6d6
| 274521 ||  || — || September 24, 2008 || Mount Lemmon || Mount Lemmon Survey || — || align=right | 3.0 km || 
|-id=522 bgcolor=#d6d6d6
| 274522 ||  || — || September 25, 2008 || Mount Lemmon || Mount Lemmon Survey || — || align=right | 2.8 km || 
|-id=523 bgcolor=#E9E9E9
| 274523 ||  || — || September 25, 2008 || Kitt Peak || Spacewatch || XIZ || align=right | 1.6 km || 
|-id=524 bgcolor=#d6d6d6
| 274524 ||  || — || September 25, 2008 || Kitt Peak || Spacewatch || KOR || align=right | 1.7 km || 
|-id=525 bgcolor=#E9E9E9
| 274525 ||  || — || September 26, 2008 || Kitt Peak || Spacewatch || — || align=right | 3.2 km || 
|-id=526 bgcolor=#d6d6d6
| 274526 ||  || — || September 26, 2008 || Kitt Peak || Spacewatch || — || align=right | 4.7 km || 
|-id=527 bgcolor=#d6d6d6
| 274527 ||  || — || September 26, 2008 || Kitt Peak || Spacewatch || HYG || align=right | 4.1 km || 
|-id=528 bgcolor=#d6d6d6
| 274528 ||  || — || September 26, 2008 || Bergisch Gladbac || W. Bickel || — || align=right | 3.1 km || 
|-id=529 bgcolor=#d6d6d6
| 274529 ||  || — || September 29, 2008 || Kitt Peak || Spacewatch || EOS || align=right | 1.9 km || 
|-id=530 bgcolor=#d6d6d6
| 274530 ||  || — || September 29, 2008 || Kitt Peak || Spacewatch || — || align=right | 4.1 km || 
|-id=531 bgcolor=#d6d6d6
| 274531 ||  || — || September 30, 2008 || La Sagra || OAM Obs. || — || align=right | 3.2 km || 
|-id=532 bgcolor=#d6d6d6
| 274532 ||  || — || September 30, 2008 || La Sagra || OAM Obs. || — || align=right | 3.7 km || 
|-id=533 bgcolor=#d6d6d6
| 274533 ||  || — || September 28, 2008 || Mount Lemmon || Mount Lemmon Survey || EOS || align=right | 2.6 km || 
|-id=534 bgcolor=#d6d6d6
| 274534 ||  || — || September 28, 2008 || Mount Lemmon || Mount Lemmon Survey || — || align=right | 4.7 km || 
|-id=535 bgcolor=#E9E9E9
| 274535 ||  || — || September 29, 2008 || Dauban || F. Kugel || — || align=right | 1.7 km || 
|-id=536 bgcolor=#E9E9E9
| 274536 ||  || — || September 29, 2008 || Kitt Peak || Spacewatch || — || align=right | 2.7 km || 
|-id=537 bgcolor=#d6d6d6
| 274537 ||  || — || September 29, 2008 || Kitt Peak || Spacewatch || — || align=right | 2.8 km || 
|-id=538 bgcolor=#E9E9E9
| 274538 ||  || — || September 29, 2008 || Kitt Peak || Spacewatch || — || align=right | 3.0 km || 
|-id=539 bgcolor=#d6d6d6
| 274539 ||  || — || September 29, 2008 || Catalina || CSS || KOR || align=right | 1.7 km || 
|-id=540 bgcolor=#E9E9E9
| 274540 ||  || — || September 29, 2008 || Kitt Peak || Spacewatch || — || align=right | 3.4 km || 
|-id=541 bgcolor=#d6d6d6
| 274541 ||  || — || September 30, 2008 || La Sagra || OAM Obs. || NAE || align=right | 3.8 km || 
|-id=542 bgcolor=#E9E9E9
| 274542 ||  || — || September 30, 2008 || La Sagra || OAM Obs. || — || align=right | 2.9 km || 
|-id=543 bgcolor=#d6d6d6
| 274543 ||  || — || September 20, 2008 || Kitt Peak || Spacewatch || SHU3:2 || align=right | 6.0 km || 
|-id=544 bgcolor=#E9E9E9
| 274544 ||  || — || September 21, 2008 || Catalina || CSS || — || align=right | 4.0 km || 
|-id=545 bgcolor=#E9E9E9
| 274545 ||  || — || September 22, 2008 || Kitt Peak || Spacewatch || — || align=right | 1.6 km || 
|-id=546 bgcolor=#d6d6d6
| 274546 ||  || — || September 23, 2008 || Mount Lemmon || Mount Lemmon Survey || 7:4 || align=right | 4.6 km || 
|-id=547 bgcolor=#d6d6d6
| 274547 ||  || — || September 23, 2008 || Kitt Peak || Spacewatch || — || align=right | 4.4 km || 
|-id=548 bgcolor=#E9E9E9
| 274548 ||  || — || September 23, 2008 || Mount Lemmon || Mount Lemmon Survey || — || align=right | 2.3 km || 
|-id=549 bgcolor=#d6d6d6
| 274549 ||  || — || September 24, 2008 || Mount Lemmon || Mount Lemmon Survey || — || align=right | 4.6 km || 
|-id=550 bgcolor=#E9E9E9
| 274550 ||  || — || September 24, 2008 || Mount Lemmon || Mount Lemmon Survey || — || align=right | 3.1 km || 
|-id=551 bgcolor=#d6d6d6
| 274551 ||  || — || September 21, 2008 || Mount Lemmon || Mount Lemmon Survey || — || align=right | 5.2 km || 
|-id=552 bgcolor=#d6d6d6
| 274552 ||  || — || September 21, 2008 || Siding Spring || SSS || BRA || align=right | 2.4 km || 
|-id=553 bgcolor=#E9E9E9
| 274553 ||  || — || September 22, 2008 || Kitt Peak || Spacewatch || — || align=right | 1.1 km || 
|-id=554 bgcolor=#d6d6d6
| 274554 ||  || — || September 26, 2008 || Kitt Peak || Spacewatch || — || align=right | 5.9 km || 
|-id=555 bgcolor=#d6d6d6
| 274555 ||  || — || September 22, 2008 || Kitt Peak || Spacewatch || — || align=right | 3.8 km || 
|-id=556 bgcolor=#d6d6d6
| 274556 ||  || — || September 22, 2008 || Mount Lemmon || Mount Lemmon Survey || HYG || align=right | 3.3 km || 
|-id=557 bgcolor=#E9E9E9
| 274557 ||  || — || September 22, 2008 || Mount Lemmon || Mount Lemmon Survey || — || align=right | 1.5 km || 
|-id=558 bgcolor=#d6d6d6
| 274558 ||  || — || September 24, 2008 || Kitt Peak || Spacewatch || — || align=right | 3.3 km || 
|-id=559 bgcolor=#d6d6d6
| 274559 ||  || — || September 22, 2008 || Mount Lemmon || Mount Lemmon Survey || SYL7:4 || align=right | 6.2 km || 
|-id=560 bgcolor=#E9E9E9
| 274560 ||  || — || September 25, 2008 || Mount Lemmon || Mount Lemmon Survey || DOR || align=right | 2.9 km || 
|-id=561 bgcolor=#d6d6d6
| 274561 ||  || — || September 23, 2008 || Mount Lemmon || Mount Lemmon Survey || K-2 || align=right | 1.7 km || 
|-id=562 bgcolor=#C2FFFF
| 274562 ||  || — || September 22, 2008 || Mount Lemmon || Mount Lemmon Survey || L4 || align=right | 7.3 km || 
|-id=563 bgcolor=#d6d6d6
| 274563 ||  || — || September 24, 2008 || Kitt Peak || Spacewatch || EOS || align=right | 3.7 km || 
|-id=564 bgcolor=#d6d6d6
| 274564 ||  || — || September 19, 2008 || Kitt Peak || Spacewatch || — || align=right | 3.0 km || 
|-id=565 bgcolor=#d6d6d6
| 274565 ||  || — || September 24, 2008 || Mount Lemmon || Mount Lemmon Survey || EOS || align=right | 2.6 km || 
|-id=566 bgcolor=#C2FFFF
| 274566 ||  || — || September 24, 2008 || Catalina || CSS || L4 || align=right | 12 km || 
|-id=567 bgcolor=#E9E9E9
| 274567 ||  || — || September 24, 2008 || Catalina || CSS || DOR || align=right | 3.4 km || 
|-id=568 bgcolor=#d6d6d6
| 274568 ||  || — || September 22, 2008 || Catalina || CSS || — || align=right | 5.9 km || 
|-id=569 bgcolor=#E9E9E9
| 274569 ||  || — || September 28, 2008 || Catalina || CSS || — || align=right | 1.8 km || 
|-id=570 bgcolor=#E9E9E9
| 274570 ||  || — || September 20, 2008 || Kitt Peak || Spacewatch || — || align=right | 3.0 km || 
|-id=571 bgcolor=#fefefe
| 274571 ||  || — || September 22, 2008 || Socorro || LINEAR || NYS || align=right data-sort-value="0.80" | 800 m || 
|-id=572 bgcolor=#E9E9E9
| 274572 ||  || — || September 22, 2008 || Socorro || LINEAR || WIT || align=right | 1.7 km || 
|-id=573 bgcolor=#E9E9E9
| 274573 ||  || — || September 24, 2008 || Socorro || LINEAR || WIT || align=right | 1.2 km || 
|-id=574 bgcolor=#d6d6d6
| 274574 ||  || — || September 24, 2008 || Kitt Peak || Spacewatch || EOS || align=right | 2.2 km || 
|-id=575 bgcolor=#E9E9E9
| 274575 ||  || — || September 24, 2008 || Mount Lemmon || Mount Lemmon Survey || PAD || align=right | 3.1 km || 
|-id=576 bgcolor=#E9E9E9
| 274576 ||  || — || September 29, 2008 || Mount Lemmon || Mount Lemmon Survey || HNS || align=right | 1.6 km || 
|-id=577 bgcolor=#d6d6d6
| 274577 ||  || — || September 29, 2008 || Socorro || LINEAR || EOS || align=right | 3.1 km || 
|-id=578 bgcolor=#E9E9E9
| 274578 ||  || — || September 30, 2008 || Socorro || LINEAR || — || align=right | 3.9 km || 
|-id=579 bgcolor=#E9E9E9
| 274579 ||  || — || September 22, 2008 || Socorro || LINEAR || — || align=right | 2.1 km || 
|-id=580 bgcolor=#d6d6d6
| 274580 ||  || — || October 1, 2008 || Hibiscus || S. F. Hönig, N. Teamo || EOS || align=right | 2.5 km || 
|-id=581 bgcolor=#E9E9E9
| 274581 ||  || — || October 1, 2008 || La Sagra || OAM Obs. || MIS || align=right | 2.8 km || 
|-id=582 bgcolor=#E9E9E9
| 274582 ||  || — || October 3, 2008 || La Sagra || OAM Obs. || — || align=right | 2.8 km || 
|-id=583 bgcolor=#d6d6d6
| 274583 ||  || — || October 3, 2008 || La Sagra || OAM Obs. || — || align=right | 5.1 km || 
|-id=584 bgcolor=#d6d6d6
| 274584 ||  || — || October 3, 2008 || La Sagra || OAM Obs. || — || align=right | 3.4 km || 
|-id=585 bgcolor=#d6d6d6
| 274585 ||  || — || October 3, 2008 || La Sagra || OAM Obs. || — || align=right | 3.3 km || 
|-id=586 bgcolor=#E9E9E9
| 274586 ||  || — || October 4, 2008 || La Sagra || OAM Obs. || — || align=right | 3.5 km || 
|-id=587 bgcolor=#d6d6d6
| 274587 ||  || — || October 4, 2008 || La Sagra || OAM Obs. || — || align=right | 3.4 km || 
|-id=588 bgcolor=#d6d6d6
| 274588 ||  || — || October 9, 2008 || Catalina || CSS || Tj (2.99) || align=right | 6.4 km || 
|-id=589 bgcolor=#d6d6d6
| 274589 ||  || — || October 1, 2008 || Mount Lemmon || Mount Lemmon Survey || KOR || align=right | 1.5 km || 
|-id=590 bgcolor=#E9E9E9
| 274590 ||  || — || October 1, 2008 || Mount Lemmon || Mount Lemmon Survey || — || align=right | 1.0 km || 
|-id=591 bgcolor=#d6d6d6
| 274591 ||  || — || October 9, 2008 || Kachina || J. Hobart || EUP || align=right | 4.7 km || 
|-id=592 bgcolor=#E9E9E9
| 274592 ||  || — || October 1, 2008 || La Sagra || OAM Obs. || — || align=right | 2.6 km || 
|-id=593 bgcolor=#E9E9E9
| 274593 ||  || — || October 1, 2008 || Catalina || CSS || — || align=right | 3.6 km || 
|-id=594 bgcolor=#d6d6d6
| 274594 ||  || — || October 1, 2008 || Mount Lemmon || Mount Lemmon Survey || K-2 || align=right | 1.6 km || 
|-id=595 bgcolor=#d6d6d6
| 274595 ||  || — || October 1, 2008 || Mount Lemmon || Mount Lemmon Survey || KOR || align=right | 1.7 km || 
|-id=596 bgcolor=#d6d6d6
| 274596 ||  || — || October 1, 2008 || Mount Lemmon || Mount Lemmon Survey || HYG || align=right | 3.2 km || 
|-id=597 bgcolor=#d6d6d6
| 274597 ||  || — || October 1, 2008 || Kitt Peak || Spacewatch || KOR || align=right | 1.5 km || 
|-id=598 bgcolor=#d6d6d6
| 274598 ||  || — || April 16, 2001 || Kitt Peak || Spacewatch || — || align=right | 2.8 km || 
|-id=599 bgcolor=#d6d6d6
| 274599 ||  || — || October 1, 2008 || Mount Lemmon || Mount Lemmon Survey || SYL7:4 || align=right | 3.4 km || 
|-id=600 bgcolor=#d6d6d6
| 274600 ||  || — || October 1, 2008 || Mount Lemmon || Mount Lemmon Survey || — || align=right | 2.5 km || 
|}

274601–274700 

|-bgcolor=#E9E9E9
| 274601 ||  || — || October 1, 2008 || Catalina || CSS || — || align=right | 2.0 km || 
|-id=602 bgcolor=#d6d6d6
| 274602 ||  || — || October 1, 2008 || Mount Lemmon || Mount Lemmon Survey || 7:4 || align=right | 3.5 km || 
|-id=603 bgcolor=#d6d6d6
| 274603 ||  || — || October 1, 2008 || Mount Lemmon || Mount Lemmon Survey || — || align=right | 4.5 km || 
|-id=604 bgcolor=#d6d6d6
| 274604 ||  || — || October 1, 2008 || Kitt Peak || Spacewatch || EOS || align=right | 4.7 km || 
|-id=605 bgcolor=#E9E9E9
| 274605 ||  || — || October 1, 2008 || Kitt Peak || Spacewatch || — || align=right | 3.3 km || 
|-id=606 bgcolor=#fefefe
| 274606 ||  || — || October 2, 2008 || Kitt Peak || Spacewatch || NYS || align=right data-sort-value="0.72" | 720 m || 
|-id=607 bgcolor=#E9E9E9
| 274607 ||  || — || October 2, 2008 || Kitt Peak || Spacewatch || — || align=right | 3.7 km || 
|-id=608 bgcolor=#d6d6d6
| 274608 ||  || — || October 2, 2008 || Kitt Peak || Spacewatch || EOS || align=right | 2.9 km || 
|-id=609 bgcolor=#d6d6d6
| 274609 ||  || — || October 2, 2008 || Kitt Peak || Spacewatch || HYG || align=right | 3.3 km || 
|-id=610 bgcolor=#d6d6d6
| 274610 ||  || — || October 2, 2008 || Kitt Peak || Spacewatch || KOR || align=right | 1.9 km || 
|-id=611 bgcolor=#d6d6d6
| 274611 ||  || — || October 2, 2008 || Kitt Peak || Spacewatch || KOR || align=right | 1.6 km || 
|-id=612 bgcolor=#d6d6d6
| 274612 ||  || — || October 2, 2008 || Kitt Peak || Spacewatch || — || align=right | 2.7 km || 
|-id=613 bgcolor=#d6d6d6
| 274613 ||  || — || October 2, 2008 || Kitt Peak || Spacewatch || EOS || align=right | 2.5 km || 
|-id=614 bgcolor=#E9E9E9
| 274614 ||  || — || October 2, 2008 || Kitt Peak || Spacewatch || NEM || align=right | 2.3 km || 
|-id=615 bgcolor=#E9E9E9
| 274615 ||  || — || October 2, 2008 || Kitt Peak || Spacewatch || — || align=right | 1.7 km || 
|-id=616 bgcolor=#d6d6d6
| 274616 ||  || — || October 2, 2008 || Mount Lemmon || Mount Lemmon Survey || — || align=right | 4.5 km || 
|-id=617 bgcolor=#d6d6d6
| 274617 ||  || — || October 2, 2008 || Kitt Peak || Spacewatch || — || align=right | 6.3 km || 
|-id=618 bgcolor=#d6d6d6
| 274618 ||  || — || October 2, 2008 || Kitt Peak || Spacewatch || — || align=right | 3.0 km || 
|-id=619 bgcolor=#d6d6d6
| 274619 ||  || — || October 2, 2008 || Kitt Peak || Spacewatch || — || align=right | 3.3 km || 
|-id=620 bgcolor=#d6d6d6
| 274620 ||  || — || October 2, 2008 || Kitt Peak || Spacewatch || — || align=right | 3.5 km || 
|-id=621 bgcolor=#d6d6d6
| 274621 ||  || — || October 2, 2008 || Kitt Peak || Spacewatch || — || align=right | 4.5 km || 
|-id=622 bgcolor=#E9E9E9
| 274622 ||  || — || October 2, 2008 || Mount Lemmon || Mount Lemmon Survey || — || align=right | 1.3 km || 
|-id=623 bgcolor=#E9E9E9
| 274623 ||  || — || October 2, 2008 || Kitt Peak || Spacewatch || HNA || align=right | 2.8 km || 
|-id=624 bgcolor=#d6d6d6
| 274624 ||  || — || October 2, 2008 || Kitt Peak || Spacewatch || — || align=right | 4.5 km || 
|-id=625 bgcolor=#d6d6d6
| 274625 ||  || — || October 2, 2008 || Kitt Peak || Spacewatch || — || align=right | 5.4 km || 
|-id=626 bgcolor=#d6d6d6
| 274626 ||  || — || October 2, 2008 || Mount Lemmon || Mount Lemmon Survey || KOR || align=right | 1.7 km || 
|-id=627 bgcolor=#FA8072
| 274627 ||  || — || October 2, 2008 || Mount Lemmon || Mount Lemmon Survey || — || align=right | 1.8 km || 
|-id=628 bgcolor=#d6d6d6
| 274628 ||  || — || October 3, 2008 || La Sagra || OAM Obs. || — || align=right | 3.6 km || 
|-id=629 bgcolor=#d6d6d6
| 274629 ||  || — || October 3, 2008 || Kitt Peak || Spacewatch || — || align=right | 3.1 km || 
|-id=630 bgcolor=#d6d6d6
| 274630 ||  || — || October 3, 2008 || Mount Lemmon || Mount Lemmon Survey || — || align=right | 2.5 km || 
|-id=631 bgcolor=#d6d6d6
| 274631 ||  || — || October 3, 2008 || Kitt Peak || Spacewatch || — || align=right | 4.3 km || 
|-id=632 bgcolor=#d6d6d6
| 274632 ||  || — || October 3, 2008 || Kitt Peak || Spacewatch || — || align=right | 3.2 km || 
|-id=633 bgcolor=#d6d6d6
| 274633 ||  || — || October 3, 2008 || Kitt Peak || Spacewatch || — || align=right | 3.2 km || 
|-id=634 bgcolor=#C2FFFF
| 274634 ||  || — || October 3, 2008 || Kitt Peak || Spacewatch || L4 || align=right | 10 km || 
|-id=635 bgcolor=#d6d6d6
| 274635 ||  || — || October 5, 2008 || La Sagra || OAM Obs. || CRO || align=right | 3.8 km || 
|-id=636 bgcolor=#d6d6d6
| 274636 ||  || — || October 6, 2008 || Kitt Peak || Spacewatch || KOR || align=right | 1.4 km || 
|-id=637 bgcolor=#E9E9E9
| 274637 ||  || — || October 6, 2008 || Mount Lemmon || Mount Lemmon Survey || HOF || align=right | 3.1 km || 
|-id=638 bgcolor=#d6d6d6
| 274638 ||  || — || October 6, 2008 || Catalina || CSS || — || align=right | 4.3 km || 
|-id=639 bgcolor=#E9E9E9
| 274639 ||  || — || October 6, 2008 || Catalina || CSS || — || align=right | 1.5 km || 
|-id=640 bgcolor=#d6d6d6
| 274640 ||  || — || October 6, 2008 || Kitt Peak || Spacewatch || — || align=right | 2.7 km || 
|-id=641 bgcolor=#fefefe
| 274641 ||  || — || October 6, 2008 || Catalina || CSS || — || align=right | 1.7 km || 
|-id=642 bgcolor=#d6d6d6
| 274642 ||  || — || October 6, 2008 || Kitt Peak || Spacewatch || KOR || align=right | 1.8 km || 
|-id=643 bgcolor=#E9E9E9
| 274643 ||  || — || October 7, 2008 || Mount Lemmon || Mount Lemmon Survey || — || align=right | 1.9 km || 
|-id=644 bgcolor=#E9E9E9
| 274644 ||  || — || October 8, 2008 || Mount Lemmon || Mount Lemmon Survey || — || align=right | 1.9 km || 
|-id=645 bgcolor=#d6d6d6
| 274645 ||  || — || October 8, 2008 || Mount Lemmon || Mount Lemmon Survey || HYG || align=right | 3.2 km || 
|-id=646 bgcolor=#d6d6d6
| 274646 ||  || — || October 8, 2008 || Mount Lemmon || Mount Lemmon Survey || — || align=right | 4.0 km || 
|-id=647 bgcolor=#d6d6d6
| 274647 ||  || — || October 8, 2008 || Kitt Peak || Spacewatch || — || align=right | 4.8 km || 
|-id=648 bgcolor=#d6d6d6
| 274648 ||  || — || October 9, 2008 || Kitt Peak || Spacewatch || — || align=right | 4.4 km || 
|-id=649 bgcolor=#d6d6d6
| 274649 ||  || — || October 9, 2008 || Mount Lemmon || Mount Lemmon Survey || — || align=right | 4.4 km || 
|-id=650 bgcolor=#d6d6d6
| 274650 ||  || — || October 9, 2008 || Mount Lemmon || Mount Lemmon Survey || — || align=right | 4.5 km || 
|-id=651 bgcolor=#C2FFFF
| 274651 ||  || — || October 9, 2008 || Mount Lemmon || Mount Lemmon Survey || L4 || align=right | 11 km || 
|-id=652 bgcolor=#d6d6d6
| 274652 ||  || — || October 9, 2008 || Mount Lemmon || Mount Lemmon Survey || — || align=right | 2.5 km || 
|-id=653 bgcolor=#d6d6d6
| 274653 ||  || — || October 9, 2008 || Mount Lemmon || Mount Lemmon Survey || — || align=right | 2.7 km || 
|-id=654 bgcolor=#E9E9E9
| 274654 ||  || — || October 9, 2008 || Mount Lemmon || Mount Lemmon Survey || — || align=right | 2.5 km || 
|-id=655 bgcolor=#d6d6d6
| 274655 ||  || — || October 9, 2008 || Mount Lemmon || Mount Lemmon Survey || KOR || align=right | 1.9 km || 
|-id=656 bgcolor=#E9E9E9
| 274656 ||  || — || October 9, 2008 || Mount Lemmon || Mount Lemmon Survey || HEN || align=right | 1.3 km || 
|-id=657 bgcolor=#d6d6d6
| 274657 ||  || — || October 9, 2008 || Mount Lemmon || Mount Lemmon Survey || — || align=right | 3.3 km || 
|-id=658 bgcolor=#d6d6d6
| 274658 ||  || — || October 2, 2008 || Kitt Peak || Spacewatch || SHU3:2 || align=right | 6.1 km || 
|-id=659 bgcolor=#d6d6d6
| 274659 ||  || — || October 4, 2008 || Catalina || CSS || — || align=right | 4.3 km || 
|-id=660 bgcolor=#d6d6d6
| 274660 ||  || — || October 2, 2008 || Mount Lemmon || Mount Lemmon Survey || EOS || align=right | 2.4 km || 
|-id=661 bgcolor=#d6d6d6
| 274661 ||  || — || October 3, 2008 || Mount Lemmon || Mount Lemmon Survey || — || align=right | 3.8 km || 
|-id=662 bgcolor=#d6d6d6
| 274662 ||  || — || October 3, 2008 || Mount Lemmon || Mount Lemmon Survey || EOS || align=right | 2.5 km || 
|-id=663 bgcolor=#d6d6d6
| 274663 ||  || — || October 9, 2008 || Mount Lemmon || Mount Lemmon Survey || — || align=right | 4.7 km || 
|-id=664 bgcolor=#E9E9E9
| 274664 ||  || — || October 9, 2008 || Catalina || CSS || — || align=right | 2.9 km || 
|-id=665 bgcolor=#d6d6d6
| 274665 ||  || — || October 8, 2008 || Catalina || CSS || — || align=right | 4.1 km || 
|-id=666 bgcolor=#C2FFFF
| 274666 ||  || — || October 2, 2008 || Kitt Peak || Spacewatch || L4 || align=right | 8.5 km || 
|-id=667 bgcolor=#E9E9E9
| 274667 ||  || — || October 9, 2008 || Kitt Peak || Spacewatch || — || align=right | 3.4 km || 
|-id=668 bgcolor=#E9E9E9
| 274668 ||  || — || October 1, 2008 || Catalina || CSS || PAD || align=right | 3.7 km || 
|-id=669 bgcolor=#d6d6d6
| 274669 ||  || — || October 1, 2008 || Catalina || CSS || — || align=right | 6.0 km || 
|-id=670 bgcolor=#d6d6d6
| 274670 ||  || — || October 9, 2008 || Catalina || CSS || — || align=right | 5.7 km || 
|-id=671 bgcolor=#E9E9E9
| 274671 ||  || — || October 1, 2008 || Catalina || CSS || — || align=right | 1.9 km || 
|-id=672 bgcolor=#d6d6d6
| 274672 ||  || — || October 7, 2008 || Kitt Peak || Spacewatch || — || align=right | 3.6 km || 
|-id=673 bgcolor=#E9E9E9
| 274673 ||  || — || October 7, 2008 || Goodricke-Pigott || R. A. Tucker || — || align=right | 3.2 km || 
|-id=674 bgcolor=#E9E9E9
| 274674 ||  || — || October 8, 2008 || Catalina || CSS || — || align=right | 1.6 km || 
|-id=675 bgcolor=#C2FFFF
| 274675 ||  || — || October 17, 2008 || Kitt Peak || Spacewatch || L4ERY || align=right | 12 km || 
|-id=676 bgcolor=#E9E9E9
| 274676 ||  || — || October 17, 2008 || Kitt Peak || Spacewatch || — || align=right | 2.6 km || 
|-id=677 bgcolor=#d6d6d6
| 274677 ||  || — || October 17, 2008 || Kitt Peak || Spacewatch || EOS || align=right | 2.1 km || 
|-id=678 bgcolor=#d6d6d6
| 274678 ||  || — || October 17, 2008 || Kitt Peak || Spacewatch || — || align=right | 2.3 km || 
|-id=679 bgcolor=#d6d6d6
| 274679 ||  || — || October 17, 2008 || Kitt Peak || Spacewatch || 3:2 || align=right | 4.7 km || 
|-id=680 bgcolor=#C2FFFF
| 274680 ||  || — || October 17, 2008 || Kitt Peak || Spacewatch || L4 || align=right | 7.4 km || 
|-id=681 bgcolor=#d6d6d6
| 274681 ||  || — || October 17, 2008 || Kitt Peak || Spacewatch || — || align=right | 4.7 km || 
|-id=682 bgcolor=#d6d6d6
| 274682 ||  || — || October 18, 2008 || Kitt Peak || Spacewatch || — || align=right | 2.6 km || 
|-id=683 bgcolor=#d6d6d6
| 274683 ||  || — || October 19, 2008 || Kitt Peak || Spacewatch || — || align=right | 4.2 km || 
|-id=684 bgcolor=#E9E9E9
| 274684 ||  || — || October 20, 2008 || Mount Lemmon || Mount Lemmon Survey || MAR || align=right | 1.3 km || 
|-id=685 bgcolor=#d6d6d6
| 274685 ||  || — || October 20, 2008 || Kitt Peak || Spacewatch || VER || align=right | 3.6 km || 
|-id=686 bgcolor=#d6d6d6
| 274686 ||  || — || October 20, 2008 || Kitt Peak || Spacewatch || EOS || align=right | 2.0 km || 
|-id=687 bgcolor=#d6d6d6
| 274687 ||  || — || October 20, 2008 || Kitt Peak || Spacewatch || HYG || align=right | 3.1 km || 
|-id=688 bgcolor=#d6d6d6
| 274688 ||  || — || October 20, 2008 || Mount Lemmon || Mount Lemmon Survey || HYG || align=right | 3.7 km || 
|-id=689 bgcolor=#d6d6d6
| 274689 ||  || — || October 20, 2008 || Mount Lemmon || Mount Lemmon Survey || — || align=right | 2.5 km || 
|-id=690 bgcolor=#d6d6d6
| 274690 ||  || — || October 20, 2008 || Kitt Peak || Spacewatch || — || align=right | 4.7 km || 
|-id=691 bgcolor=#E9E9E9
| 274691 ||  || — || October 20, 2008 || Mount Lemmon || Mount Lemmon Survey || AGN || align=right | 1.3 km || 
|-id=692 bgcolor=#d6d6d6
| 274692 ||  || — || October 20, 2008 || Mount Lemmon || Mount Lemmon Survey || EMA || align=right | 4.8 km || 
|-id=693 bgcolor=#d6d6d6
| 274693 ||  || — || October 20, 2008 || Mount Lemmon || Mount Lemmon Survey || — || align=right | 6.7 km || 
|-id=694 bgcolor=#d6d6d6
| 274694 ||  || — || October 20, 2008 || Mount Lemmon || Mount Lemmon Survey || — || align=right | 3.0 km || 
|-id=695 bgcolor=#d6d6d6
| 274695 ||  || — || October 21, 2008 || Kitt Peak || Spacewatch || — || align=right | 3.1 km || 
|-id=696 bgcolor=#d6d6d6
| 274696 ||  || — || October 21, 2008 || Kitt Peak || Spacewatch || — || align=right | 3.2 km || 
|-id=697 bgcolor=#d6d6d6
| 274697 ||  || — || October 21, 2008 || Mount Lemmon || Mount Lemmon Survey || — || align=right | 4.5 km || 
|-id=698 bgcolor=#d6d6d6
| 274698 ||  || — || October 21, 2008 || Kitt Peak || Spacewatch || EOS || align=right | 2.6 km || 
|-id=699 bgcolor=#d6d6d6
| 274699 ||  || — || October 21, 2008 || Kitt Peak || Spacewatch || — || align=right | 3.5 km || 
|-id=700 bgcolor=#d6d6d6
| 274700 ||  || — || October 21, 2008 || Kitt Peak || Spacewatch || EOS || align=right | 2.7 km || 
|}

274701–274800 

|-bgcolor=#d6d6d6
| 274701 ||  || — || October 22, 2008 || Kitt Peak || Spacewatch || EOS || align=right | 2.6 km || 
|-id=702 bgcolor=#E9E9E9
| 274702 ||  || — || October 22, 2008 || Mount Lemmon || Mount Lemmon Survey || MRX || align=right | 1.6 km || 
|-id=703 bgcolor=#E9E9E9
| 274703 ||  || — || October 23, 2008 || Kitt Peak || Spacewatch || — || align=right | 1.8 km || 
|-id=704 bgcolor=#d6d6d6
| 274704 ||  || — || October 23, 2008 || Kitt Peak || Spacewatch || — || align=right | 4.5 km || 
|-id=705 bgcolor=#E9E9E9
| 274705 ||  || — || October 27, 2008 || Hibiscus || J.-C. Pelle || — || align=right | 3.0 km || 
|-id=706 bgcolor=#d6d6d6
| 274706 ||  || — || October 24, 2008 || Socorro || LINEAR || — || align=right | 3.9 km || 
|-id=707 bgcolor=#d6d6d6
| 274707 ||  || — || October 27, 2008 || Bisei SG Center || BATTeRS || — || align=right | 4.0 km || 
|-id=708 bgcolor=#d6d6d6
| 274708 ||  || — || October 20, 2008 || Kitt Peak || Spacewatch || — || align=right | 3.5 km || 
|-id=709 bgcolor=#E9E9E9
| 274709 ||  || — || October 20, 2008 || Kitt Peak || Spacewatch || — || align=right | 1.3 km || 
|-id=710 bgcolor=#d6d6d6
| 274710 ||  || — || October 21, 2008 || Kitt Peak || Spacewatch || — || align=right | 4.1 km || 
|-id=711 bgcolor=#d6d6d6
| 274711 ||  || — || October 21, 2008 || Kitt Peak || Spacewatch || — || align=right | 4.1 km || 
|-id=712 bgcolor=#d6d6d6
| 274712 ||  || — || October 22, 2008 || Kitt Peak || Spacewatch || EOS || align=right | 2.7 km || 
|-id=713 bgcolor=#d6d6d6
| 274713 ||  || — || October 22, 2008 || Kitt Peak || Spacewatch || — || align=right | 4.3 km || 
|-id=714 bgcolor=#d6d6d6
| 274714 ||  || — || October 22, 2008 || Kitt Peak || Spacewatch || EOS || align=right | 2.2 km || 
|-id=715 bgcolor=#d6d6d6
| 274715 ||  || — || October 23, 2008 || Kitt Peak || Spacewatch || EOS || align=right | 2.9 km || 
|-id=716 bgcolor=#d6d6d6
| 274716 ||  || — || October 23, 2008 || Kitt Peak || Spacewatch || — || align=right | 3.1 km || 
|-id=717 bgcolor=#d6d6d6
| 274717 ||  || — || October 23, 2008 || Kitt Peak || Spacewatch || HYG || align=right | 3.7 km || 
|-id=718 bgcolor=#d6d6d6
| 274718 ||  || — || October 23, 2008 || Kitt Peak || Spacewatch || — || align=right | 3.1 km || 
|-id=719 bgcolor=#d6d6d6
| 274719 ||  || — || October 23, 2008 || Kitt Peak || Spacewatch || — || align=right | 3.5 km || 
|-id=720 bgcolor=#d6d6d6
| 274720 ||  || — || October 23, 2008 || Kitt Peak || Spacewatch || — || align=right | 3.9 km || 
|-id=721 bgcolor=#d6d6d6
| 274721 ||  || — || October 23, 2008 || Mount Lemmon || Mount Lemmon Survey || — || align=right | 3.8 km || 
|-id=722 bgcolor=#E9E9E9
| 274722 ||  || — || October 24, 2008 || Kitt Peak || Spacewatch || GAL || align=right | 1.9 km || 
|-id=723 bgcolor=#d6d6d6
| 274723 ||  || — || October 24, 2008 || Kitt Peak || Spacewatch || HYG || align=right | 3.9 km || 
|-id=724 bgcolor=#d6d6d6
| 274724 ||  || — || October 24, 2008 || Kitt Peak || Spacewatch || — || align=right | 4.0 km || 
|-id=725 bgcolor=#d6d6d6
| 274725 ||  || — || October 24, 2008 || Catalina || CSS || — || align=right | 5.0 km || 
|-id=726 bgcolor=#E9E9E9
| 274726 ||  || — || October 24, 2008 || Kitt Peak || Spacewatch || — || align=right | 1.8 km || 
|-id=727 bgcolor=#d6d6d6
| 274727 ||  || — || October 24, 2008 || Mount Lemmon || Mount Lemmon Survey || — || align=right | 3.3 km || 
|-id=728 bgcolor=#d6d6d6
| 274728 ||  || — || October 24, 2008 || Mount Lemmon || Mount Lemmon Survey || — || align=right | 3.7 km || 
|-id=729 bgcolor=#E9E9E9
| 274729 ||  || — || October 24, 2008 || Kitt Peak || Spacewatch || — || align=right | 3.2 km || 
|-id=730 bgcolor=#d6d6d6
| 274730 ||  || — || October 25, 2008 || Mount Lemmon || Mount Lemmon Survey || KOR || align=right | 1.5 km || 
|-id=731 bgcolor=#E9E9E9
| 274731 ||  || — || October 25, 2008 || Mount Lemmon || Mount Lemmon Survey || — || align=right | 1.7 km || 
|-id=732 bgcolor=#d6d6d6
| 274732 ||  || — || October 25, 2008 || Mount Lemmon || Mount Lemmon Survey || — || align=right | 3.5 km || 
|-id=733 bgcolor=#d6d6d6
| 274733 ||  || — || October 25, 2008 || Mount Lemmon || Mount Lemmon Survey || — || align=right | 4.0 km || 
|-id=734 bgcolor=#d6d6d6
| 274734 ||  || — || October 26, 2008 || Siding Spring || SSS || — || align=right | 4.7 km || 
|-id=735 bgcolor=#d6d6d6
| 274735 ||  || — || October 28, 2008 || Socorro || LINEAR || NAE || align=right | 5.3 km || 
|-id=736 bgcolor=#d6d6d6
| 274736 ||  || — || October 28, 2008 || Socorro || LINEAR || — || align=right | 5.2 km || 
|-id=737 bgcolor=#d6d6d6
| 274737 ||  || — || October 24, 2008 || Siding Spring || SSS || ALA || align=right | 7.8 km || 
|-id=738 bgcolor=#d6d6d6
| 274738 ||  || — || October 22, 2008 || Mount Lemmon || Mount Lemmon Survey || — || align=right | 4.1 km || 
|-id=739 bgcolor=#d6d6d6
| 274739 ||  || — || October 23, 2008 || Kitt Peak || Spacewatch || — || align=right | 2.4 km || 
|-id=740 bgcolor=#d6d6d6
| 274740 ||  || — || October 23, 2008 || Kitt Peak || Spacewatch || — || align=right | 2.2 km || 
|-id=741 bgcolor=#d6d6d6
| 274741 ||  || — || October 25, 2008 || Kitt Peak || Spacewatch || — || align=right | 3.4 km || 
|-id=742 bgcolor=#d6d6d6
| 274742 ||  || — || October 25, 2008 || Kitt Peak || Spacewatch || EOS || align=right | 1.9 km || 
|-id=743 bgcolor=#d6d6d6
| 274743 ||  || — || October 25, 2008 || Kitt Peak || Spacewatch || — || align=right | 3.8 km || 
|-id=744 bgcolor=#d6d6d6
| 274744 ||  || — || October 26, 2008 || Mount Lemmon || Mount Lemmon Survey || — || align=right | 3.6 km || 
|-id=745 bgcolor=#E9E9E9
| 274745 ||  || — || October 27, 2008 || Kitt Peak || Spacewatch || — || align=right | 1.1 km || 
|-id=746 bgcolor=#d6d6d6
| 274746 ||  || — || October 28, 2008 || Kitt Peak || Spacewatch || HYG || align=right | 3.1 km || 
|-id=747 bgcolor=#fefefe
| 274747 ||  || — || October 28, 2008 || Mount Lemmon || Mount Lemmon Survey || — || align=right data-sort-value="0.91" | 910 m || 
|-id=748 bgcolor=#d6d6d6
| 274748 ||  || — || October 28, 2008 || Kitt Peak || Spacewatch || — || align=right | 3.4 km || 
|-id=749 bgcolor=#d6d6d6
| 274749 ||  || — || October 28, 2008 || Catalina || CSS || EUP || align=right | 5.3 km || 
|-id=750 bgcolor=#d6d6d6
| 274750 ||  || — || October 28, 2008 || Kitt Peak || Spacewatch || 3:2 || align=right | 4.4 km || 
|-id=751 bgcolor=#d6d6d6
| 274751 ||  || — || October 28, 2008 || Mount Lemmon || Mount Lemmon Survey || — || align=right | 4.5 km || 
|-id=752 bgcolor=#d6d6d6
| 274752 ||  || — || October 28, 2008 || Mount Lemmon || Mount Lemmon Survey || VER || align=right | 4.7 km || 
|-id=753 bgcolor=#d6d6d6
| 274753 ||  || — || October 28, 2008 || Mount Lemmon || Mount Lemmon Survey || SYL7:4 || align=right | 6.8 km || 
|-id=754 bgcolor=#d6d6d6
| 274754 ||  || — || October 28, 2008 || Mount Lemmon || Mount Lemmon Survey || EOS || align=right | 2.7 km || 
|-id=755 bgcolor=#d6d6d6
| 274755 ||  || — || October 28, 2008 || Mount Lemmon || Mount Lemmon Survey || — || align=right | 3.6 km || 
|-id=756 bgcolor=#d6d6d6
| 274756 ||  || — || October 28, 2008 || Mount Lemmon || Mount Lemmon Survey || — || align=right | 2.6 km || 
|-id=757 bgcolor=#E9E9E9
| 274757 ||  || — || October 28, 2008 || Mount Lemmon || Mount Lemmon Survey || — || align=right | 3.7 km || 
|-id=758 bgcolor=#d6d6d6
| 274758 ||  || — || October 28, 2008 || Mount Lemmon || Mount Lemmon Survey || KOR || align=right | 1.9 km || 
|-id=759 bgcolor=#d6d6d6
| 274759 ||  || — || October 28, 2008 || Mount Lemmon || Mount Lemmon Survey || — || align=right | 3.1 km || 
|-id=760 bgcolor=#E9E9E9
| 274760 ||  || — || October 28, 2008 || Kitt Peak || Spacewatch || — || align=right | 2.2 km || 
|-id=761 bgcolor=#d6d6d6
| 274761 ||  || — || October 29, 2008 || Kitt Peak || Spacewatch || — || align=right | 3.8 km || 
|-id=762 bgcolor=#E9E9E9
| 274762 ||  || — || October 29, 2008 || Mount Lemmon || Mount Lemmon Survey || ADE || align=right | 4.1 km || 
|-id=763 bgcolor=#d6d6d6
| 274763 ||  || — || October 29, 2008 || Kitt Peak || Spacewatch || 3:2 || align=right | 4.9 km || 
|-id=764 bgcolor=#d6d6d6
| 274764 ||  || — || October 30, 2008 || Catalina || CSS || — || align=right | 3.0 km || 
|-id=765 bgcolor=#d6d6d6
| 274765 ||  || — || October 31, 2008 || Mount Lemmon || Mount Lemmon Survey || — || align=right | 5.1 km || 
|-id=766 bgcolor=#d6d6d6
| 274766 ||  || — || October 31, 2008 || Kitt Peak || Spacewatch || — || align=right | 4.0 km || 
|-id=767 bgcolor=#d6d6d6
| 274767 ||  || — || October 31, 2008 || Kitt Peak || Spacewatch || HYG || align=right | 4.0 km || 
|-id=768 bgcolor=#d6d6d6
| 274768 ||  || — || October 23, 2008 || Kitt Peak || Spacewatch || — || align=right | 3.9 km || 
|-id=769 bgcolor=#d6d6d6
| 274769 ||  || — || October 24, 2008 || Catalina || CSS || — || align=right | 5.3 km || 
|-id=770 bgcolor=#d6d6d6
| 274770 ||  || — || October 23, 2008 || Kitt Peak || Spacewatch || — || align=right | 3.5 km || 
|-id=771 bgcolor=#d6d6d6
| 274771 ||  || — || October 27, 2008 || Mount Lemmon || Mount Lemmon Survey || HYG || align=right | 3.6 km || 
|-id=772 bgcolor=#d6d6d6
| 274772 ||  || — || October 21, 2008 || Mount Lemmon || Mount Lemmon Survey || — || align=right | 2.7 km || 
|-id=773 bgcolor=#C2FFFF
| 274773 ||  || — || October 26, 2008 || Kitt Peak || Spacewatch || L4 || align=right | 6.3 km || 
|-id=774 bgcolor=#E9E9E9
| 274774 ||  || — || October 25, 2008 || Catalina || CSS || — || align=right | 1.5 km || 
|-id=775 bgcolor=#E9E9E9
| 274775 ||  || — || October 26, 2008 || Siding Spring || SSS || EUN || align=right | 2.0 km || 
|-id=776 bgcolor=#E9E9E9
| 274776 ||  || — || October 26, 2008 || Catalina || CSS || — || align=right | 3.9 km || 
|-id=777 bgcolor=#d6d6d6
| 274777 ||  || — || November 3, 2008 || Socorro || LINEAR || — || align=right | 7.3 km || 
|-id=778 bgcolor=#d6d6d6
| 274778 ||  || — || November 3, 2008 || Socorro || LINEAR || EOS || align=right | 2.9 km || 
|-id=779 bgcolor=#d6d6d6
| 274779 ||  || — || November 1, 2008 || Mount Lemmon || Mount Lemmon Survey || — || align=right | 4.7 km || 
|-id=780 bgcolor=#d6d6d6
| 274780 ||  || — || November 1, 2008 || Kitt Peak || Spacewatch || — || align=right | 5.0 km || 
|-id=781 bgcolor=#d6d6d6
| 274781 ||  || — || November 2, 2008 || Kitt Peak || Spacewatch || HYG || align=right | 4.7 km || 
|-id=782 bgcolor=#E9E9E9
| 274782 ||  || — || November 4, 2008 || Catalina || CSS || — || align=right | 2.1 km || 
|-id=783 bgcolor=#d6d6d6
| 274783 ||  || — || November 6, 2008 || Mount Lemmon || Mount Lemmon Survey || — || align=right | 4.2 km || 
|-id=784 bgcolor=#E9E9E9
| 274784 ||  || — || November 6, 2008 || Mount Lemmon || Mount Lemmon Survey || — || align=right | 1.5 km || 
|-id=785 bgcolor=#d6d6d6
| 274785 ||  || — || November 7, 2008 || Mount Lemmon || Mount Lemmon Survey || — || align=right | 5.8 km || 
|-id=786 bgcolor=#d6d6d6
| 274786 ||  || — || November 2, 2008 || Catalina || CSS || — || align=right | 3.9 km || 
|-id=787 bgcolor=#d6d6d6
| 274787 ||  || — || November 17, 2008 || Kitt Peak || Spacewatch || EOS || align=right | 1.9 km || 
|-id=788 bgcolor=#d6d6d6
| 274788 ||  || — || November 18, 2008 || Socorro || LINEAR || EOS || align=right | 3.5 km || 
|-id=789 bgcolor=#E9E9E9
| 274789 ||  || — || November 17, 2008 || Kitt Peak || Spacewatch || AGN || align=right | 1.4 km || 
|-id=790 bgcolor=#d6d6d6
| 274790 ||  || — || November 17, 2008 || Catalina || CSS || — || align=right | 5.5 km || 
|-id=791 bgcolor=#d6d6d6
| 274791 ||  || — || November 17, 2008 || Kitt Peak || Spacewatch || — || align=right | 3.5 km || 
|-id=792 bgcolor=#d6d6d6
| 274792 ||  || — || November 17, 2008 || Kitt Peak || Spacewatch || — || align=right | 3.5 km || 
|-id=793 bgcolor=#E9E9E9
| 274793 ||  || — || November 17, 2008 || Kitt Peak || Spacewatch || — || align=right | 1.4 km || 
|-id=794 bgcolor=#d6d6d6
| 274794 ||  || — || November 18, 2008 || Catalina || CSS || — || align=right | 4.6 km || 
|-id=795 bgcolor=#E9E9E9
| 274795 ||  || — || November 19, 2008 || Kitt Peak || Spacewatch || — || align=right | 4.5 km || 
|-id=796 bgcolor=#d6d6d6
| 274796 ||  || — || November 20, 2008 || Mount Lemmon || Mount Lemmon Survey || — || align=right | 4.6 km || 
|-id=797 bgcolor=#d6d6d6
| 274797 ||  || — || November 24, 2008 || Calvin-Rehoboth || L. A. Molnar || — || align=right | 3.6 km || 
|-id=798 bgcolor=#d6d6d6
| 274798 ||  || — || November 18, 2008 || Catalina || CSS || — || align=right | 4.1 km || 
|-id=799 bgcolor=#E9E9E9
| 274799 ||  || — || January 31, 2006 || Kitt Peak || Spacewatch || — || align=right | 3.2 km || 
|-id=800 bgcolor=#E9E9E9
| 274800 ||  || — || October 9, 1999 || Kitt Peak || Spacewatch || HEN || align=right | 1.1 km || 
|}

274801–274900 

|-bgcolor=#E9E9E9
| 274801 ||  || — || November 24, 2008 || Mount Lemmon || Mount Lemmon Survey || — || align=right | 1.7 km || 
|-id=802 bgcolor=#E9E9E9
| 274802 ||  || — || November 30, 2008 || Socorro || LINEAR || — || align=right | 2.4 km || 
|-id=803 bgcolor=#d6d6d6
| 274803 ||  || — || November 30, 2008 || Kitt Peak || Spacewatch || 7:4 || align=right | 3.9 km || 
|-id=804 bgcolor=#d6d6d6
| 274804 ||  || — || November 20, 2008 || Bisei SG Center || BATTeRS || — || align=right | 5.3 km || 
|-id=805 bgcolor=#d6d6d6
| 274805 ||  || — || November 18, 2008 || Kitt Peak || Spacewatch || — || align=right | 4.0 km || 
|-id=806 bgcolor=#d6d6d6
| 274806 ||  || — || December 1, 2008 || Kitt Peak || Spacewatch || — || align=right | 2.9 km || 
|-id=807 bgcolor=#d6d6d6
| 274807 ||  || — || December 3, 2008 || Mount Lemmon || Mount Lemmon Survey || — || align=right | 7.6 km || 
|-id=808 bgcolor=#d6d6d6
| 274808 ||  || — || December 2, 2008 || Kitt Peak || Spacewatch || — || align=right | 4.0 km || 
|-id=809 bgcolor=#d6d6d6
| 274809 ||  || — || December 2, 2008 || Kitt Peak || Spacewatch || — || align=right | 3.0 km || 
|-id=810 bgcolor=#d6d6d6
| 274810 Fedáksári ||  ||  || December 27, 2008 || Piszkéstető || K. Sárneczky || SHU3:2 || align=right | 3.9 km || 
|-id=811 bgcolor=#d6d6d6
| 274811 ||  || — || December 30, 2008 || Kitt Peak || Spacewatch || HIL3:2 || align=right | 7.0 km || 
|-id=812 bgcolor=#E9E9E9
| 274812 ||  || — || January 18, 2009 || Socorro || LINEAR || ADE || align=right | 3.5 km || 
|-id=813 bgcolor=#d6d6d6
| 274813 ||  || — || January 16, 2009 || Kitt Peak || Spacewatch || THM || align=right | 3.3 km || 
|-id=814 bgcolor=#E9E9E9
| 274814 ||  || — || May 14, 2009 || Kitt Peak || Spacewatch || — || align=right | 2.6 km || 
|-id=815 bgcolor=#E9E9E9
| 274815 ||  || — || May 25, 2009 || Hibiscus || N. Teamo || — || align=right | 2.2 km || 
|-id=816 bgcolor=#E9E9E9
| 274816 ||  || — || May 27, 2009 || Mount Lemmon || Mount Lemmon Survey || — || align=right | 1.8 km || 
|-id=817 bgcolor=#fefefe
| 274817 ||  || — || July 15, 2009 || La Sagra || OAM Obs. || — || align=right | 1.5 km || 
|-id=818 bgcolor=#fefefe
| 274818 ||  || — || July 12, 2009 || Kitt Peak || Spacewatch || MAS || align=right data-sort-value="0.85" | 850 m || 
|-id=819 bgcolor=#fefefe
| 274819 ||  || — || January 16, 1997 || Kitt Peak || Spacewatch || H || align=right data-sort-value="0.62" | 620 m || 
|-id=820 bgcolor=#fefefe
| 274820 ||  || — || July 19, 2009 || La Sagra || OAM Obs. || V || align=right | 1.1 km || 
|-id=821 bgcolor=#fefefe
| 274821 ||  || — || July 21, 2009 || Plana || F. Fratev || MAS || align=right data-sort-value="0.96" | 960 m || 
|-id=822 bgcolor=#fefefe
| 274822 ||  || — || July 28, 2009 || Tiki || N. Teamo || — || align=right data-sort-value="0.86" | 860 m || 
|-id=823 bgcolor=#fefefe
| 274823 ||  || — || July 30, 2009 || Skylive Obs. || F. Tozzi || — || align=right | 1.5 km || 
|-id=824 bgcolor=#fefefe
| 274824 ||  || — || August 14, 2009 || Marly || P. Kocher || FLO || align=right data-sort-value="0.65" | 650 m || 
|-id=825 bgcolor=#fefefe
| 274825 ||  || — || August 15, 2009 || Catalina || CSS || FLO || align=right data-sort-value="0.73" | 730 m || 
|-id=826 bgcolor=#fefefe
| 274826 ||  || — || August 15, 2009 || Socorro || LINEAR || NYS || align=right data-sort-value="0.92" | 920 m || 
|-id=827 bgcolor=#fefefe
| 274827 ||  || — || August 15, 2009 || Kitt Peak || Spacewatch || — || align=right | 1.1 km || 
|-id=828 bgcolor=#fefefe
| 274828 ||  || — || August 15, 2009 || Catalina || CSS || NYS || align=right data-sort-value="0.84" | 840 m || 
|-id=829 bgcolor=#fefefe
| 274829 ||  || — || August 15, 2009 || Kitt Peak || Spacewatch || NYS || align=right data-sort-value="0.73" | 730 m || 
|-id=830 bgcolor=#fefefe
| 274830 ||  || — || August 15, 2009 || Kitt Peak || Spacewatch || — || align=right data-sort-value="0.95" | 950 m || 
|-id=831 bgcolor=#E9E9E9
| 274831 ||  || — || August 15, 2009 || Kitt Peak || Spacewatch || — || align=right data-sort-value="0.79" | 790 m || 
|-id=832 bgcolor=#fefefe
| 274832 ||  || — || August 16, 2009 || La Sagra || OAM Obs. || — || align=right | 1.4 km || 
|-id=833 bgcolor=#FA8072
| 274833 ||  || — || August 16, 2009 || Skylive Obs. || F. Tozzi || — || align=right data-sort-value="0.82" | 820 m || 
|-id=834 bgcolor=#FA8072
| 274834 ||  || — || August 20, 2009 || Socorro || LINEAR || — || align=right | 2.7 km || 
|-id=835 bgcolor=#fefefe
| 274835 Aachen ||  ||  || August 22, 2009 || Tzec Maun || E. Schwab || FLO || align=right data-sort-value="0.98" | 980 m || 
|-id=836 bgcolor=#fefefe
| 274836 ||  || — || August 16, 2009 || Kitt Peak || Spacewatch || — || align=right data-sort-value="0.96" | 960 m || 
|-id=837 bgcolor=#fefefe
| 274837 ||  || — || August 16, 2009 || Kitt Peak || Spacewatch || — || align=right data-sort-value="0.74" | 740 m || 
|-id=838 bgcolor=#fefefe
| 274838 ||  || — || August 19, 2009 || La Sagra || OAM Obs. || — || align=right | 1.1 km || 
|-id=839 bgcolor=#fefefe
| 274839 ||  || — || August 20, 2009 || La Sagra || OAM Obs. || — || align=right | 1.4 km || 
|-id=840 bgcolor=#E9E9E9
| 274840 ||  || — || August 16, 2009 || La Sagra || OAM Obs. || — || align=right | 1.0 km || 
|-id=841 bgcolor=#fefefe
| 274841 ||  || — || August 16, 2009 || La Sagra || OAM Obs. || NYS || align=right | 1.0 km || 
|-id=842 bgcolor=#E9E9E9
| 274842 ||  || — || August 19, 2009 || Kitt Peak || Spacewatch || EUN || align=right | 1.5 km || 
|-id=843 bgcolor=#fefefe
| 274843 Mykhailopetrenko ||  ||  || August 24, 2009 || Andrushivka || Andrushivka Obs. || — || align=right data-sort-value="0.91" | 910 m || 
|-id=844 bgcolor=#fefefe
| 274844 ||  || — || August 27, 2009 || Catalina || CSS || H || align=right data-sort-value="0.67" | 670 m || 
|-id=845 bgcolor=#d6d6d6
| 274845 ||  || — || August 31, 2009 || Bergisch Gladbac || W. Bickel || HYG || align=right | 3.2 km || 
|-id=846 bgcolor=#fefefe
| 274846 ||  || — || August 30, 2009 || Taunus || S. Karge, R. Kling || FLO || align=right data-sort-value="0.82" | 820 m || 
|-id=847 bgcolor=#d6d6d6
| 274847 ||  || — || August 29, 2009 || Taunus || S. Karge, R. Kling || EOS || align=right | 2.8 km || 
|-id=848 bgcolor=#fefefe
| 274848 ||  || — || August 20, 2009 || Kitt Peak || Spacewatch || NYS || align=right data-sort-value="0.78" | 780 m || 
|-id=849 bgcolor=#fefefe
| 274849 ||  || — || August 20, 2009 || La Sagra || OAM Obs. || — || align=right data-sort-value="0.88" | 880 m || 
|-id=850 bgcolor=#E9E9E9
| 274850 ||  || — || August 28, 2009 || La Sagra || OAM Obs. || — || align=right | 1.7 km || 
|-id=851 bgcolor=#fefefe
| 274851 ||  || — || August 26, 2009 || Catalina || CSS || — || align=right data-sort-value="0.98" | 980 m || 
|-id=852 bgcolor=#fefefe
| 274852 ||  || — || August 28, 2009 || Kitt Peak || Spacewatch || — || align=right data-sort-value="0.83" | 830 m || 
|-id=853 bgcolor=#fefefe
| 274853 ||  || — || August 29, 2009 || La Sagra || OAM Obs. || FLO || align=right data-sort-value="0.79" | 790 m || 
|-id=854 bgcolor=#fefefe
| 274854 ||  || — || August 17, 2009 || Catalina || CSS || — || align=right data-sort-value="0.98" | 980 m || 
|-id=855 bgcolor=#FFC2E0
| 274855 ||  || — || September 14, 2009 || Socorro || LINEAR || AMO || align=right data-sort-value="0.74" | 740 m || 
|-id=856 bgcolor=#fefefe
| 274856 Rosendosalvado ||  ||  || September 13, 2009 || ESA OGS || M. Busch, R. Kresken || FLO || align=right data-sort-value="0.56" | 560 m || 
|-id=857 bgcolor=#d6d6d6
| 274857 ||  || — || September 12, 2009 || Kitt Peak || Spacewatch || HYG || align=right | 3.7 km || 
|-id=858 bgcolor=#fefefe
| 274858 ||  || — || September 12, 2009 || Kitt Peak || Spacewatch || — || align=right | 1.1 km || 
|-id=859 bgcolor=#fefefe
| 274859 ||  || — || September 15, 2009 || Kitt Peak || Spacewatch || — || align=right data-sort-value="0.76" | 760 m || 
|-id=860 bgcolor=#d6d6d6
| 274860 Emilylakdawalla ||  ||  || September 13, 2009 || ESA OGS || M. Busch, R. Kresken || EOS || align=right | 2.5 km || 
|-id=861 bgcolor=#fefefe
| 274861 ||  || — || September 14, 2009 || Kitt Peak || Spacewatch || — || align=right data-sort-value="0.79" | 790 m || 
|-id=862 bgcolor=#d6d6d6
| 274862 ||  || — || September 14, 2009 || Kitt Peak || Spacewatch || — || align=right | 2.6 km || 
|-id=863 bgcolor=#d6d6d6
| 274863 ||  || — || September 15, 2009 || Kitt Peak || Spacewatch || KOR || align=right | 1.2 km || 
|-id=864 bgcolor=#E9E9E9
| 274864 ||  || — || September 15, 2009 || Kitt Peak || Spacewatch || NEM || align=right | 2.4 km || 
|-id=865 bgcolor=#E9E9E9
| 274865 ||  || — || September 15, 2009 || Kitt Peak || Spacewatch || — || align=right | 1.7 km || 
|-id=866 bgcolor=#E9E9E9
| 274866 ||  || — || September 15, 2009 || Kitt Peak || Spacewatch || — || align=right | 2.2 km || 
|-id=867 bgcolor=#fefefe
| 274867 ||  || — || September 15, 2009 || Kitt Peak || Spacewatch || — || align=right data-sort-value="0.86" | 860 m || 
|-id=868 bgcolor=#d6d6d6
| 274868 ||  || — || September 15, 2009 || Kitt Peak || Spacewatch || KOR || align=right | 1.6 km || 
|-id=869 bgcolor=#fefefe
| 274869 ||  || — || September 15, 2009 || Kitt Peak || Spacewatch || FLO || align=right data-sort-value="0.67" | 670 m || 
|-id=870 bgcolor=#C2FFFF
| 274870 ||  || — || September 15, 2009 || Kitt Peak || Spacewatch || L4 || align=right | 14 km || 
|-id=871 bgcolor=#E9E9E9
| 274871 ||  || — || September 15, 2009 || Kitt Peak || Spacewatch || — || align=right | 2.4 km || 
|-id=872 bgcolor=#fefefe
| 274872 ||  || — || September 15, 2009 || Mount Lemmon || Mount Lemmon Survey || — || align=right data-sort-value="0.90" | 900 m || 
|-id=873 bgcolor=#d6d6d6
| 274873 ||  || — || September 12, 2009 || Kitt Peak || Spacewatch || THM || align=right | 4.3 km || 
|-id=874 bgcolor=#d6d6d6
| 274874 ||  || — || September 15, 2009 || Kitt Peak || Spacewatch || KOR || align=right | 1.3 km || 
|-id=875 bgcolor=#E9E9E9
| 274875 ||  || — || September 15, 2009 || Kitt Peak || Spacewatch || HOF || align=right | 2.8 km || 
|-id=876 bgcolor=#E9E9E9
| 274876 ||  || — || September 15, 2009 || Kitt Peak || Spacewatch || — || align=right | 2.5 km || 
|-id=877 bgcolor=#fefefe
| 274877 ||  || — || September 15, 2009 || Kitt Peak || Spacewatch || — || align=right data-sort-value="0.79" | 790 m || 
|-id=878 bgcolor=#fefefe
| 274878 ||  || — || September 16, 2009 || Mount Lemmon || Mount Lemmon Survey || — || align=right data-sort-value="0.71" | 710 m || 
|-id=879 bgcolor=#fefefe
| 274879 ||  || — || September 16, 2009 || Mount Lemmon || Mount Lemmon Survey || — || align=right data-sort-value="0.67" | 670 m || 
|-id=880 bgcolor=#fefefe
| 274880 ||  || — || September 18, 2009 || Bisei SG Center || BATTeRS || — || align=right data-sort-value="0.93" | 930 m || 
|-id=881 bgcolor=#fefefe
| 274881 ||  || — || September 16, 2009 || Kitt Peak || Spacewatch || FLO || align=right data-sort-value="0.70" | 700 m || 
|-id=882 bgcolor=#fefefe
| 274882 ||  || — || September 16, 2009 || Kitt Peak || Spacewatch || — || align=right data-sort-value="0.94" | 940 m || 
|-id=883 bgcolor=#fefefe
| 274883 ||  || — || September 16, 2009 || Kitt Peak || Spacewatch || FLO || align=right data-sort-value="0.73" | 730 m || 
|-id=884 bgcolor=#fefefe
| 274884 ||  || — || September 16, 2009 || Kitt Peak || Spacewatch || — || align=right | 1.1 km || 
|-id=885 bgcolor=#fefefe
| 274885 ||  || — || September 16, 2009 || Kitt Peak || Spacewatch || — || align=right data-sort-value="0.99" | 990 m || 
|-id=886 bgcolor=#E9E9E9
| 274886 ||  || — || September 16, 2009 || Kitt Peak || Spacewatch || — || align=right | 2.0 km || 
|-id=887 bgcolor=#fefefe
| 274887 ||  || — || September 17, 2009 || Kitt Peak || Spacewatch || V || align=right data-sort-value="0.88" | 880 m || 
|-id=888 bgcolor=#d6d6d6
| 274888 ||  || — || September 17, 2009 || Kitt Peak || Spacewatch || — || align=right | 2.6 km || 
|-id=889 bgcolor=#d6d6d6
| 274889 ||  || — || September 17, 2009 || Kitt Peak || Spacewatch || — || align=right | 2.9 km || 
|-id=890 bgcolor=#fefefe
| 274890 ||  || — || September 17, 2009 || Mount Lemmon || Mount Lemmon Survey || — || align=right data-sort-value="0.82" | 820 m || 
|-id=891 bgcolor=#d6d6d6
| 274891 ||  || — || September 17, 2009 || Kitt Peak || Spacewatch || — || align=right | 4.3 km || 
|-id=892 bgcolor=#E9E9E9
| 274892 ||  || — || September 17, 2009 || Kitt Peak || Spacewatch || — || align=right | 1.5 km || 
|-id=893 bgcolor=#E9E9E9
| 274893 ||  || — || September 17, 2009 || Kitt Peak || Spacewatch || — || align=right | 2.2 km || 
|-id=894 bgcolor=#E9E9E9
| 274894 ||  || — || September 17, 2009 || Kitt Peak || Spacewatch || — || align=right data-sort-value="0.93" | 930 m || 
|-id=895 bgcolor=#E9E9E9
| 274895 ||  || — || September 17, 2009 || Mount Lemmon || Mount Lemmon Survey || — || align=right | 2.4 km || 
|-id=896 bgcolor=#fefefe
| 274896 ||  || — || September 18, 2009 || Mount Lemmon || Mount Lemmon Survey || — || align=right data-sort-value="0.70" | 700 m || 
|-id=897 bgcolor=#fefefe
| 274897 ||  || — || September 18, 2009 || Mount Lemmon || Mount Lemmon Survey || V || align=right data-sort-value="0.54" | 540 m || 
|-id=898 bgcolor=#E9E9E9
| 274898 ||  || — || September 18, 2009 || Kitt Peak || Spacewatch || — || align=right | 1.7 km || 
|-id=899 bgcolor=#E9E9E9
| 274899 ||  || — || September 18, 2009 || Kitt Peak || Spacewatch || — || align=right | 2.2 km || 
|-id=900 bgcolor=#fefefe
| 274900 ||  || — || September 18, 2009 || Kitt Peak || Spacewatch || — || align=right data-sort-value="0.91" | 910 m || 
|}

274901–275000 

|-bgcolor=#fefefe
| 274901 ||  || — || September 19, 2009 || Kitt Peak || Spacewatch || FLO || align=right data-sort-value="0.88" | 880 m || 
|-id=902 bgcolor=#fefefe
| 274902 ||  || — || September 24, 2009 || Mayhill || A. Lowe || SUL || align=right | 2.3 km || 
|-id=903 bgcolor=#fefefe
| 274903 ||  || — || September 16, 2009 || Mount Lemmon || Mount Lemmon Survey || — || align=right | 1.0 km || 
|-id=904 bgcolor=#E9E9E9
| 274904 ||  || — || September 16, 2009 || Kitt Peak || Spacewatch || — || align=right | 1.7 km || 
|-id=905 bgcolor=#C2FFFF
| 274905 ||  || — || September 17, 2009 || Kitt Peak || Spacewatch || L4 || align=right | 10 km || 
|-id=906 bgcolor=#fefefe
| 274906 ||  || — || September 18, 2009 || Kitt Peak || Spacewatch || V || align=right | 1.1 km || 
|-id=907 bgcolor=#d6d6d6
| 274907 ||  || — || September 18, 2009 || Kitt Peak || Spacewatch || 637 || align=right | 2.8 km || 
|-id=908 bgcolor=#fefefe
| 274908 ||  || — || September 18, 2009 || Kitt Peak || Spacewatch || MAS || align=right data-sort-value="0.99" | 990 m || 
|-id=909 bgcolor=#d6d6d6
| 274909 ||  || — || September 18, 2009 || Kitt Peak || Spacewatch || — || align=right | 4.4 km || 
|-id=910 bgcolor=#fefefe
| 274910 ||  || — || September 18, 2009 || Kitt Peak || Spacewatch || FLO || align=right data-sort-value="0.66" | 660 m || 
|-id=911 bgcolor=#d6d6d6
| 274911 ||  || — || September 18, 2009 || Kitt Peak || Spacewatch || — || align=right | 3.5 km || 
|-id=912 bgcolor=#E9E9E9
| 274912 ||  || — || September 18, 2009 || Kitt Peak || Spacewatch || — || align=right | 2.2 km || 
|-id=913 bgcolor=#E9E9E9
| 274913 ||  || — || September 18, 2009 || Mount Lemmon || Mount Lemmon Survey || — || align=right | 3.0 km || 
|-id=914 bgcolor=#E9E9E9
| 274914 ||  || — || September 18, 2009 || Mount Lemmon || Mount Lemmon Survey || EUN || align=right | 1.3 km || 
|-id=915 bgcolor=#E9E9E9
| 274915 ||  || — || September 19, 2009 || Kitt Peak || Spacewatch || — || align=right | 1.2 km || 
|-id=916 bgcolor=#fefefe
| 274916 ||  || — || September 19, 2009 || Mount Lemmon || Mount Lemmon Survey || NYS || align=right data-sort-value="0.83" | 830 m || 
|-id=917 bgcolor=#fefefe
| 274917 ||  || — || September 20, 2009 || Kitt Peak || Spacewatch || — || align=right | 1.3 km || 
|-id=918 bgcolor=#E9E9E9
| 274918 ||  || — || September 20, 2009 || Kitt Peak || Spacewatch || NEM || align=right | 2.5 km || 
|-id=919 bgcolor=#E9E9E9
| 274919 ||  || — || September 20, 2009 || Kitt Peak || Spacewatch || — || align=right | 1.2 km || 
|-id=920 bgcolor=#fefefe
| 274920 ||  || — || September 20, 2009 || Kitt Peak || Spacewatch || — || align=right data-sort-value="0.95" | 950 m || 
|-id=921 bgcolor=#fefefe
| 274921 ||  || — || September 20, 2009 || Kitt Peak || Spacewatch || V || align=right data-sort-value="0.65" | 650 m || 
|-id=922 bgcolor=#fefefe
| 274922 ||  || — || September 20, 2009 || Kitt Peak || Spacewatch || — || align=right data-sort-value="0.94" | 940 m || 
|-id=923 bgcolor=#fefefe
| 274923 ||  || — || September 21, 2009 || La Sagra || OAM Obs. || PHO || align=right | 1.5 km || 
|-id=924 bgcolor=#fefefe
| 274924 ||  || — || September 21, 2009 || Catalina || CSS || NYS || align=right data-sort-value="0.65" | 650 m || 
|-id=925 bgcolor=#E9E9E9
| 274925 ||  || — || September 21, 2009 || Kitt Peak || Spacewatch || EUN || align=right | 1.4 km || 
|-id=926 bgcolor=#E9E9E9
| 274926 ||  || — || September 22, 2009 || Bergisch Gladbac || W. Bickel || DOR || align=right | 2.5 km || 
|-id=927 bgcolor=#E9E9E9
| 274927 ||  || — || September 24, 2009 || Mount Lemmon || Mount Lemmon Survey || — || align=right | 2.4 km || 
|-id=928 bgcolor=#E9E9E9
| 274928 ||  || — || September 26, 2009 || Taunus || R. Kling, U. Zimmer || — || align=right | 1.5 km || 
|-id=929 bgcolor=#fefefe
| 274929 ||  || — || September 23, 2009 || Mount Lemmon || Mount Lemmon Survey || NYS || align=right data-sort-value="0.66" | 660 m || 
|-id=930 bgcolor=#E9E9E9
| 274930 ||  || — || September 21, 2009 || Kitt Peak || Spacewatch || WIT || align=right | 1.00 km || 
|-id=931 bgcolor=#fefefe
| 274931 ||  || — || September 22, 2009 || Kitt Peak || Spacewatch || — || align=right data-sort-value="0.89" | 890 m || 
|-id=932 bgcolor=#d6d6d6
| 274932 ||  || — || September 22, 2009 || Kitt Peak || Spacewatch || THM || align=right | 2.3 km || 
|-id=933 bgcolor=#d6d6d6
| 274933 ||  || — || September 22, 2009 || Kitt Peak || Spacewatch || HYG || align=right | 3.3 km || 
|-id=934 bgcolor=#fefefe
| 274934 ||  || — || September 22, 2009 || Kitt Peak || Spacewatch || NYS || align=right data-sort-value="0.91" | 910 m || 
|-id=935 bgcolor=#fefefe
| 274935 ||  || — || September 22, 2009 || Kitt Peak || Spacewatch || — || align=right data-sort-value="0.98" | 980 m || 
|-id=936 bgcolor=#E9E9E9
| 274936 ||  || — || September 23, 2009 || Kitt Peak || Spacewatch || NEM || align=right | 2.6 km || 
|-id=937 bgcolor=#fefefe
| 274937 ||  || — || September 23, 2009 || Kitt Peak || Spacewatch || — || align=right data-sort-value="0.78" | 780 m || 
|-id=938 bgcolor=#d6d6d6
| 274938 ||  || — || September 24, 2009 || Mount Lemmon || Mount Lemmon Survey || — || align=right | 2.4 km || 
|-id=939 bgcolor=#E9E9E9
| 274939 ||  || — || September 25, 2009 || Mount Lemmon || Mount Lemmon Survey || — || align=right data-sort-value="0.99" | 990 m || 
|-id=940 bgcolor=#d6d6d6
| 274940 ||  || — || September 21, 2009 || Mount Lemmon || Mount Lemmon Survey || Tj (2.97) || align=right | 4.1 km || 
|-id=941 bgcolor=#E9E9E9
| 274941 ||  || — || September 19, 2009 || Mount Lemmon || Mount Lemmon Survey || — || align=right | 2.5 km || 
|-id=942 bgcolor=#E9E9E9
| 274942 ||  || — || March 14, 2007 || Mount Lemmon || Mount Lemmon Survey || — || align=right | 2.0 km || 
|-id=943 bgcolor=#E9E9E9
| 274943 ||  || — || September 16, 2009 || Catalina || CSS || — || align=right | 2.2 km || 
|-id=944 bgcolor=#E9E9E9
| 274944 ||  || — || September 17, 2009 || Kitt Peak || Spacewatch || — || align=right | 2.6 km || 
|-id=945 bgcolor=#E9E9E9
| 274945 ||  || — || September 22, 2009 || Kitt Peak || Spacewatch || — || align=right | 2.2 km || 
|-id=946 bgcolor=#fefefe
| 274946 ||  || — || September 23, 2009 || Mount Lemmon || Mount Lemmon Survey || — || align=right data-sort-value="0.83" | 830 m || 
|-id=947 bgcolor=#fefefe
| 274947 ||  || — || September 23, 2009 || Mount Lemmon || Mount Lemmon Survey || V || align=right data-sort-value="0.67" | 670 m || 
|-id=948 bgcolor=#E9E9E9
| 274948 ||  || — || September 25, 2009 || Kitt Peak || Spacewatch || — || align=right | 2.1 km || 
|-id=949 bgcolor=#d6d6d6
| 274949 ||  || — || September 25, 2009 || Kitt Peak || Spacewatch || KOR || align=right | 1.4 km || 
|-id=950 bgcolor=#E9E9E9
| 274950 ||  || — || September 25, 2009 || Kitt Peak || Spacewatch || — || align=right | 1.5 km || 
|-id=951 bgcolor=#E9E9E9
| 274951 ||  || — || September 25, 2009 || Kitt Peak || Spacewatch || — || align=right | 2.8 km || 
|-id=952 bgcolor=#E9E9E9
| 274952 ||  || — || September 25, 2009 || Kitt Peak || Spacewatch || — || align=right | 1.9 km || 
|-id=953 bgcolor=#fefefe
| 274953 ||  || — || September 26, 2009 || Kitt Peak || Spacewatch || — || align=right | 1.0 km || 
|-id=954 bgcolor=#fefefe
| 274954 ||  || — || September 27, 2009 || Mount Lemmon || Mount Lemmon Survey || — || align=right data-sort-value="0.83" | 830 m || 
|-id=955 bgcolor=#d6d6d6
| 274955 ||  || — || September 29, 2009 || Mount Lemmon || Mount Lemmon Survey || — || align=right | 4.3 km || 
|-id=956 bgcolor=#fefefe
| 274956 ||  || — || September 17, 2009 || Mount Lemmon || Mount Lemmon Survey || — || align=right | 1.0 km || 
|-id=957 bgcolor=#fefefe
| 274957 ||  || — || September 16, 2009 || Kitt Peak || Spacewatch || CLA || align=right | 2.2 km || 
|-id=958 bgcolor=#d6d6d6
| 274958 ||  || — || September 16, 2009 || Mount Lemmon || Mount Lemmon Survey || HYG || align=right | 3.1 km || 
|-id=959 bgcolor=#fefefe
| 274959 ||  || — || September 17, 2009 || Kitt Peak || Spacewatch || MAS || align=right data-sort-value="0.71" | 710 m || 
|-id=960 bgcolor=#d6d6d6
| 274960 ||  || — || September 20, 2009 || Mount Lemmon || Mount Lemmon Survey || EOS || align=right | 3.0 km || 
|-id=961 bgcolor=#E9E9E9
| 274961 ||  || — || September 17, 2009 || Mount Lemmon || Mount Lemmon Survey || — || align=right | 1.7 km || 
|-id=962 bgcolor=#E9E9E9
| 274962 ||  || — || September 25, 2009 || Catalina || CSS || MIT || align=right | 2.3 km || 
|-id=963 bgcolor=#fefefe
| 274963 ||  || — || September 16, 2009 || Mount Lemmon || Mount Lemmon Survey || V || align=right data-sort-value="0.92" | 920 m || 
|-id=964 bgcolor=#fefefe
| 274964 ||  || — || September 19, 2009 || Catalina || CSS || — || align=right data-sort-value="0.87" | 870 m || 
|-id=965 bgcolor=#fefefe
| 274965 ||  || — || September 27, 2009 || Mount Lemmon || Mount Lemmon Survey || ERI || align=right | 1.5 km || 
|-id=966 bgcolor=#fefefe
| 274966 ||  || — || September 17, 2009 || Kitt Peak || Spacewatch || FLOfast? || align=right data-sort-value="0.80" | 800 m || 
|-id=967 bgcolor=#E9E9E9
| 274967 ||  || — || September 16, 2009 || Kitt Peak || Spacewatch || — || align=right | 2.2 km || 
|-id=968 bgcolor=#fefefe
| 274968 ||  || — || September 16, 2009 || Kitt Peak || Spacewatch || — || align=right data-sort-value="0.88" | 880 m || 
|-id=969 bgcolor=#E9E9E9
| 274969 ||  || — || September 24, 2009 || Kitt Peak || Spacewatch || — || align=right | 1.2 km || 
|-id=970 bgcolor=#C2FFFF
| 274970 ||  || — || September 28, 2009 || Mount Lemmon || Mount Lemmon Survey || L4 || align=right | 11 km || 
|-id=971 bgcolor=#E9E9E9
| 274971 ||  || — || September 16, 2009 || Kitt Peak || Spacewatch || AST || align=right | 1.7 km || 
|-id=972 bgcolor=#d6d6d6
| 274972 ||  || — || September 22, 2009 || Mount Lemmon || Mount Lemmon Survey || — || align=right | 3.5 km || 
|-id=973 bgcolor=#d6d6d6
| 274973 ||  || — || September 18, 2009 || Catalina || CSS || URS || align=right | 5.2 km || 
|-id=974 bgcolor=#fefefe
| 274974 ||  || — || September 29, 2009 || Mount Lemmon || Mount Lemmon Survey || FLO || align=right | 1.00 km || 
|-id=975 bgcolor=#fefefe
| 274975 ||  || — || September 16, 2009 || Kitt Peak || Spacewatch || V || align=right data-sort-value="0.71" | 710 m || 
|-id=976 bgcolor=#C2FFFF
| 274976 ||  || — || April 7, 2003 || Kitt Peak || Spacewatch || L4 || align=right | 11 km || 
|-id=977 bgcolor=#E9E9E9
| 274977 ||  || — || September 16, 2009 || Kitt Peak || Spacewatch || — || align=right | 1.3 km || 
|-id=978 bgcolor=#d6d6d6
| 274978 ||  || — || September 27, 2009 || Mount Lemmon || Mount Lemmon Survey || — || align=right | 3.8 km || 
|-id=979 bgcolor=#d6d6d6
| 274979 ||  || — || September 29, 2009 || Mount Lemmon || Mount Lemmon Survey || — || align=right | 4.1 km || 
|-id=980 bgcolor=#fefefe
| 274980 ||  || — || September 21, 2009 || Mount Lemmon || Mount Lemmon Survey || — || align=right | 1.1 km || 
|-id=981 bgcolor=#d6d6d6
| 274981 Petrsu ||  ||  || October 12, 2009 || Tzec Maun || A. Novichonok, D. Chestnov || K-2 || align=right | 1.7 km || 
|-id=982 bgcolor=#E9E9E9
| 274982 ||  || — || October 11, 2009 || La Sagra || OAM Obs. || — || align=right | 1.9 km || 
|-id=983 bgcolor=#E9E9E9
| 274983 ||  || — || October 13, 2009 || Mayhill || A. Lowe || — || align=right | 1.3 km || 
|-id=984 bgcolor=#fefefe
| 274984 ||  || — || October 11, 2009 || La Sagra || OAM Obs. || — || align=right data-sort-value="0.96" | 960 m || 
|-id=985 bgcolor=#fefefe
| 274985 ||  || — || October 11, 2009 || La Sagra || OAM Obs. || — || align=right data-sort-value="0.77" | 770 m || 
|-id=986 bgcolor=#E9E9E9
| 274986 ||  || — || October 12, 2009 || La Sagra || OAM Obs. || — || align=right | 2.2 km || 
|-id=987 bgcolor=#d6d6d6
| 274987 ||  || — || October 12, 2009 || La Sagra || OAM Obs. || EMA || align=right | 5.0 km || 
|-id=988 bgcolor=#C2FFFF
| 274988 ||  || — || October 13, 2009 || La Sagra || OAM Obs. || L4 || align=right | 10 km || 
|-id=989 bgcolor=#d6d6d6
| 274989 ||  || — || October 14, 2009 || Bergisch Gladbac || W. Bickel || — || align=right | 4.0 km || 
|-id=990 bgcolor=#fefefe
| 274990 ||  || — || October 12, 2009 || La Sagra || OAM Obs. || — || align=right | 1.0 km || 
|-id=991 bgcolor=#fefefe
| 274991 ||  || — || October 12, 2009 || La Sagra || OAM Obs. || V || align=right data-sort-value="0.88" | 880 m || 
|-id=992 bgcolor=#fefefe
| 274992 ||  || — || October 13, 2009 || Socorro || LINEAR || NYS || align=right data-sort-value="0.84" | 840 m || 
|-id=993 bgcolor=#d6d6d6
| 274993 ||  || — || October 14, 2009 || La Sagra || OAM Obs. || EOS || align=right | 3.2 km || 
|-id=994 bgcolor=#FA8072
| 274994 ||  || — || October 12, 2009 || La Sagra || OAM Obs. || — || align=right data-sort-value="0.98" | 980 m || 
|-id=995 bgcolor=#d6d6d6
| 274995 ||  || — || October 14, 2009 || La Sagra || OAM Obs. || — || align=right | 3.7 km || 
|-id=996 bgcolor=#fefefe
| 274996 ||  || — || October 14, 2009 || La Sagra || OAM Obs. || V || align=right data-sort-value="0.75" | 750 m || 
|-id=997 bgcolor=#fefefe
| 274997 ||  || — || October 14, 2009 || Catalina || CSS || MAS || align=right | 1.1 km || 
|-id=998 bgcolor=#fefefe
| 274998 ||  || — || October 14, 2009 || Purple Mountain || PMO NEO || — || align=right data-sort-value="0.94" | 940 m || 
|-id=999 bgcolor=#d6d6d6
| 274999 ||  || — || October 14, 2009 || La Sagra || OAM Obs. || — || align=right | 3.1 km || 
|-id=000 bgcolor=#E9E9E9
| 275000 ||  || — || October 15, 2009 || Mount Lemmon || Mount Lemmon Survey || — || align=right | 1.6 km || 
|}

References

External links 
 Discovery Circumstances: Numbered Minor Planets (270001)–(275000) (IAU Minor Planet Center)

0274